= Grenville and Stratton (electoral division) =

Former electoral division of Cornwall in the UK

- Former ward Cornwall Council
- Boundary of Grenville and Stratton in from 2013-2021.
- County: Cornwall

2013–2021
- Number of councillors: One
- Replaced by: Stratton, Kilkhampton and Morwenstow; Poundstock
- Created from: Flexbury and Poughill; Bude North and Stratton

Grenville and Stratton (Cornish: Grenville ha Strasnedh) was an electoral division of Cornwall in the United Kingdom which returned one member to sit on Cornwall Council between 2013 and 2021. It was abolished at the 2021 local elections, being succeeded by Stratton, Kilkhampton and Morwenstow and Poundstock.

== Councillors ==
Election	Member	Party
2013	Paula Dolphin	Liberal Democrat
2017	Paula Dolphin	Liberal Democrat
2018	Paula Dolphin	Independent
2021	Seat abolished	

== Extent ==
Grenville and Stratton represented the town of Stratton, the villages of Grimscott, Morwenstow and Kilkhampton, and the hamlets of Red Post, Hersham, Thurdon, Shop, Gooseham, West Youlstone, Woodford, Coombe, Stibb and Eastcott. The hamlet of Bush was shared with the Bude division. The division covered 9,825 hectares in total.

== Election results ==
=== 2017 election ===
2017 election: Grenville and Stratton
Party	Candidate	Votes	%	±%
Liberal Democrats	Paula Dolphin	727	53.9	
Conservative	Shorne Tilbey	612	45.4	
Majority		115	8.5	
Rejected ballots		10	0.7	
Turnout		1349	37.4	
Liberal Democrats hold		Swing		

=== 2013 election ===
2013 election: Grenville and Stratton
Party	Candidate	Votes	%	±%
Liberal Democrats	Paula Dolphin	864	66.0	
Conservative	Shorne Tilbey	410	31.3	
Majority		454	34.7	
Rejected ballots		35	2.7	
Turnout		1309	37.6	
Liberal Democrats win (new seat)				
