= List of shipwrecks of Cornwall (1861–1870) =

The List of shipwrecks of Cornwall (1861–1870) lists the ships which sank on or near the coasts of mainland Cornwall in that period. The list includes ships that sustained a damaged hull, which were later refloated and repaired.

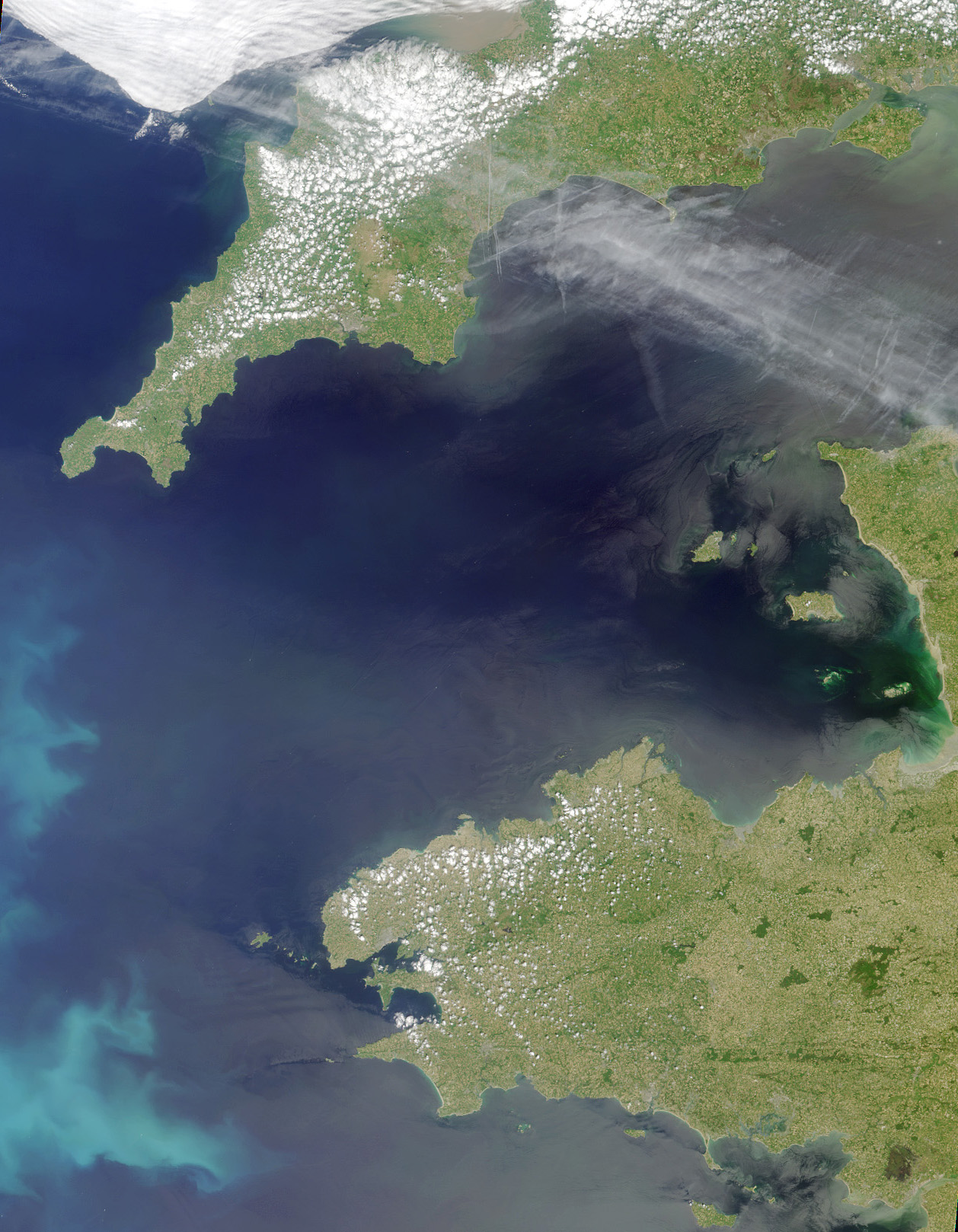
Southwestern England and the English Channel

== 1861 ==
- The Lloyds agent at Fowey informed Trinity House that a light should be provided at the entrance to Fowey harbour as in recent years, three ships had gone aground at Par beach as well as three other wrecks. Three wrecks were also lost in Looe Bay because they could not distinguish the island from the mainland in hazy weather.
- 26 January – 219 ton Brixham brig Mersey (United Kingdom) ran ashore on Porthleven beach and a total loss.
- 18 February – a Bideford polacca brigantine Hero (United Kingdom) slipped her moorings in Penzance harbour in SSW hurricane force winds. She drifted onto the Cressars and drove ashore near the railway viaduct. Four of her crew and two others drowned.
- 9 June – the Chester schooner Glynne foundered off the Longships, while carrying railway iron from Newport to San Sebastian, becoming a total loss.

== 1862 ==
- 21 October – East Indiaman Bencoolen (barque) out of Liverpool with an unspecified general cargo was wrecked at Bude Haven, its figurehead was once preserved in the churchyard there but was transferred to the town museum to save it from further decay.
- Sainte Prospere (brigantine) was in difficulties under Rinsey Head and some controversy arose due to the Penzance lifeboat failing to assist.
- overturned brig Frieza (Norway) drifted ashore under Efford Cliff at Bude; initially there was no indication of her nationality or name. She carried a cargo of petrol and a dark purple paste which may have been a dye.

== 1863 ==
- 19 May – 109 ton Penzance collier, the brigantine Scotia (United Kingdom), collided with another vessel and sank near the Runnelstone while bound from Cardiff for her home port. Her crew escaped in the ship's boat.
- 4 December – Martha Quayle of Liverpool. This vessel was seen dismasted off Hennacliff in Morwenstow with the crew making the best of their situation; two boats were lowered from the side of which one was driven northward by the heavy seas while the other came ashore unmanned. The first boat was seen by the Rev. Robert Stephen Hawker being rowed by five men but did not make a landing until Clovelly. An attempt to launch the Bude lifeboat or bring her along the land failed but by riding along the coast as far as Clovelly Hawker found the mate and four crewmen safe. He failed to persuade the men of Clovelly to launch a skiff but a customs officer from Bideford happened to be there and was able to send a message to the Appledore lifeboatmen to assist if they could. The Martha Quayle was unlighted by Saturday nightfall. On the Sunday he sent a man towards Clovelly and sometime later that man brought thanks for their deliverance from the captain and crew back to Hawker. A rowing boat crewed by 19 men went north and jointly with the Appledore lifeboatmen, who had brought their boat by land, got the Martha Quayle on shore ready to be sold by auction next day.
- unknown date – the lugger Adrien was wrecked at Gurnard's Head, Zennor with the loss of four of the five crew.
- unknown date – Febrero wrecked on the Runnelstone.

== 1864 ==
- 23 March – 121 ton Dartmouth schooner Maid o' the Mist carrying 210 tons of manure from London to Cardiff hit the Runnelstone and sank immediately. Some of the six crew did not have time to dress before they abandoned ship.
- 7 November – the crew of the St Ives schooner Jane was saved by the SS Solva' after hitting rocks near the Runnelstone. She was carrying iron ore from Charlestown to Newport.

== 1865 ==
=== January ===
- 13 January – brig Brazilie Packet (Netherlands) parted her cables when anchored near the Brisons and went on the rocks at Progo Cove, Cape Cornwall with the loss of all the crew. She was on her way from Rio Grande to Falmouth carrying hides and horns.
- 13 January – sloop Henrietta (United Kingdom) hit Barrel Point while attempting to cross Hayle Bar with the loss of all the crew and pilot.
- 14 January – brigantine Ceres (United Kingdom) carrying roof slate from Padstow to Hayle broke her moorings while in Boscastle harbour and ran up the beach during hurricane-force winds. She was badly damaged on the next tide and became a wreck.
- 14 January – schooner Elizabeth Jane (United Kingdom) carrying china clay parted her moorings and was blown out of Newquay harbour and onto Towan Beach.(United Kingdom)
- 15 January – brig Juanito (Spain) lost her way while carrying sugar and molasses from Cardenas to Greenock and struck the rocks at Duckpool, north of Bude Haven with the loss on one crew.
- 27 January – while carrying copper ore from Portreath to Neath the schooner Emma (United Kingdom) grounded on Porthminster Beach and broke up on the following tide.
- 29 January – Lifeboat Alexandra ( Royal National Lifeboat Institution) went to the aid of the brig Willie Ridley (United Kingdom) of Plymouth off the Western Green, Penzance. Eight lives saved.
- 29 January – smack Hippolyte (France) carrying potatoes and other vegetables drove onto rocks to the north of St Mawes Castle.

=== February ===
- 21 February – the sailing ship Eugenie (Prussia) of Danzig was deliberately run ashore at Crackington Haven when she started to take on water. She was bound for Barcelona from Swansea with coal and coal patent fuel.
- 21 February – steamship Rokeby loss off Newquay in WNW force 9 conditions.
- 28 February – 257 ton Bristol steamer Pioneer (United Kingdom) carrying mainly iron and copper from her home port to London struck the Runnelstone three times before steaming off. The crew of around twenty managed to escape in the ship's boat before she sank.

=== April ===
- 7 April – an unidentified lugger (France) struck the Longships at noon in thick fog. The crew were seen rowing to the north by the lighthouse men and it wasn't until Monday, 10 April that people onshore were informed.

=== May ===
- 8 May – the crew of the 97 ton Beaumaris schooner Mary (United Kingdom) carrying china clay from Par to Runcorn survived when she struck the Runnelstone.
- 10 May – Dartmouth sloop the 58 ton Galeed (United Kingdom) sank within three minutes of striking the Runnelstone while carrying superphosphate from London to Newport. Her crew of five took to the ship's boat and landed at Mousehole the following evening.

=== June ===
- 1 June – James Dunn (United Kingdom) of Truro was in collision with a large barque during the night off Higher Sharpnose, Morwenstow while en route to Swansea with copper ore.

=== October ===
- 25 October – barque Georgina (United Kingdom) went ashore in NW force 10 winds at Stanbury Mouth, Bude Haven with three dead. She was bound for Cardiff from Archangel with a cargo of ″deals″ (timber) which was sold on the beach.
- 28 October – brig Edith (United Kingdom) dragged her anchors and came ashore at Castle Point, St Mawes.
- 28 October – the St Ives lifeboat Moses ( Royal National Lifeboat Institution) rescued four of the six crew from the brigantine Providence (France) when she went ashore on Hayle Bar while carrying coal from Cardiff to St Malo. The Moses capsized twice during the rescue and the coxswain and crew received gold and silver medals from Napoleon III, Emperor of France.

=== November ===
- 22 November – the brig Rhedertenden (Norway) of Porsgrund was washed out of the harbour at St Michael's Mount and wrecked on Marazion beach.
- 23 November – schooner Adele (United Kingdom) drifted out of St Michael's Mount harbour in a gale and was driven onto Marazion beach. She was carrying china clay from Charlestown to Runcorn.
- 23 November – lugger Constance (France) carrying barley from Saint-Malo to Cardiff was driven ashore two miles west of Polperro. The master and boy were saved and two drowned.
- 24 November – the crew of the barque Annie Lee (United Kingdom) were save when she sank after dragging her anchors and fouling the chains of the Italian barque Emilie Barbame outside the Black Rock. She was out of Taganrog with wheat.
- 24 November – brig Spagna (Kingdom of Italy) carrying wheat from Taganrog to Falmouth, Cornwall was embayed in SSW hurricane force winds and wrecked under Perran Cliff in Mount's Bay.
- 24 November – brigantine Tobaco (Prussia) saved by the lifeboat Richard Lewis ( Royal National Lifeboat Institution) at Long Rock, Mount's Bay.
- 24 November – 325 ton Sunderland barque William (United Kingdom) carrying linseed from Odesa to Falmouth ran for shelter at Porthleven. The ship came to rest with her stern overhanging the quay and road, and all bar two of the crew climbed to safety.
- 24 November – in the same storm as the William the barque Santesto (Brazil) was wrecked Gunwalloe Cove.
- 28 November – dandy Susan (United Kingdom) carrying creosote stranded and lost in a force 8 northerly gale eight miles ESE (sic) of Trevose Head.
- November – Southampton brig Leila (United Kingdom) carrying coal sank after hitting the Runnelstone. The French brigantine Marie Amanda picked up the crew from the ship's boat and landed them at Penzance.
- November – schooner Resolution (United Kingdom) foundered near Land's End.

=== December ===
- 11 December – the schooner Volunteer (United Kingdom) of Plymouth was struck and sunk off Trevose Head by the SS Minerva with the loss of five crew. She was carrying coal from Swansea to Plymouth.
- 29 December – barque Juliet (United Kingdom) carrying sugar and 400 casks of rum from Demerara to London was making for Padstow Harbour and drifted ashore. The crew was saved by the Padstow lifeboat and 280 casks of rum were salvaged later.

== 1866 ==
- 11 and 12 January – ″Disastrous accidents to shipping at Plymouth, Penzance, St Ives, and other ports in the western counties; and great damage at many places inland″. Many lives and forty vessels were lost at Torbay.
- 11 January – SS Bessie (United Kingdom) of Hayle, stranded on Lelant Sands. Her crew was saved by the St Ives lifeboat ( Royal National Lifeboat Institution) and the Penzance lifeboat Richard Lewis ( Royal National Lifeboat Institution) which was hauled seven miles by eight horses.
- unknown date – Prometheus last seen twenty miles from St Ives during a severe gale. She was on voyage from Cardiff to St Ives.

== 1867 ==
=== January ===
- 3 January – lugger Marianne Shifornaine foundered nine miles north of Godrevy Point while bound for Nantes from Cardiff with coal and other unspecified cargo. Three of the four crew lost their lives.
- 5 January – two schooners the Salome (United Kingdom) of Dartmouth and the Heiress (United Kingdom) of Teignmouth were each attended by the lifeboat Richard Lewis ( Royal National Lifeboat Institution) which was launched twice from Long Rock beach.
- 5 January – brigantine Selina Ann (United Kingdom) saved by Richard Lewis ( Royal National Lifeboat Institution).
- 5 January – schooner Eliza (United Kingdom) heading for Devoran from Wales with coal, lost her foremast and maintopmast in a gale, and attempted to make for St Ives. She anchored between Gurnard's Head and Three Oar Stone but was blown back out to sea where the steamship Colon took off all of her crew of seven, bar one man Richard Bawden who fell overboard and drowned. The Eliza sank off Plymouth the previous year.
- 7 January – while on voyage from Demerara to London, the Glasgow registered barque John Gray (United Kingdom) beached at Long Rock in a tremendous SSW gale. Thirteen crew were saved by the lifeboat Richard Lewis ( Royal National Lifeboat Institution).
- 8 January – steamship Tiger (United Kingdom) heading for Liverpool from Bayonne with an unspecified cargo foundered off either the Brisons or Pendeen in a force 9 NW gale. All fourteen on board lost their lives. The ship's boat was found at Porthchapel and Joseph Bawden of Phillack was committed at Camborne Petty Sessions to two months hard labour for concealment of staves, the property of Her Majesty's Customs.
- 11 January – brig Superior (Sweden) with coal for London from Cardiff lost her bearings and canvas off the Cornish coast and struck a reef at Millook. Nine of the fifteen aboard lost their lives including the Captain.

=== February ===
- 6 February – steamship Fanny Lambert (United Kingdom) sank in a force 10 WNW gale, 6–8 miles north of St Ives Head. She was heading to Dieppe from Cardiff and all eighteen crew lost their lives.
- 6 February – during a service to the schooner Georgiana (United Kingdom) of Boston, (Lincs) which was dragging her anchors and being driven onto the Doom Bar, the lifeboat Albert Edward ( Royal National Lifeboat Institution) was driven ashore at St Minver with five of the lifeboat crew drowning. One crew from Georgiana also drowned.

=== March ===
- 17 March – Channel Island brig Providence (United Kingdom) collided with the Gambia (United Kingdom) of Plymouth, struck the Albert Pier and sank off Penzance harbour. Both crews were saved.
- 25 March – The Dutch barque " Jonkheer Meester van de Wall van Putterschoek" from Batavia to Rotterdam carrying Sugar, Coffee and Banca Tin went ashore on the Men-y-Grib rocks at Poldhu after becoming embayed in a storm. The only survivor, a Greek sailor, climbed the cliff and was rescued the following morning.

=== April ===
- April – Trinity House steamship Solva found a derelict barque, the Jane (United Kingdom) of Liverpool during the building of the Wolf Rock. An attempted tow failed when Mr Douglas, the Trinity House engineer and the mate of the Solva were injured, and the Jane slipped her tow. She eventually went ashore at Perranporth Sands. Much of her cargo was lost although some lard and oranges was strewn along the coast as was cabin furniture.
- 4 April – barque Inga carrying cotton from Alexandria to Falmouth capsized in a force 10 WNW gale off Perranporth Sands drowning thirteen of her eighteen crew. The five remaining crew were saved by a barque from Norway.
- 18 April – sailing ship the Hamlin (United Kingdom) struck the Bridges, between the Brisons and Cape Cornwall during fog. She had left the Thames for Cardiff with ballast of 500 tons of slag and dross, piloted by the unqualified Mr Thomas Burfield.

=== June ===
- 12 June – schooner Uncle John (United Kingdom) of Bideford with coal for Bude from Newport misjudged the entrance to Bude Haven and hit the back of the breakwater. The three crew jumped onto a rock from the stern minutes before she broke up.

=== September ===
- 13 September – sailing vessel Mary E Campbell (United Kingdom) of Liverpool left her home port with coal for Aden and foundered 24 miles NW of Sharpnose. Seven of her crew of twenty and twenty–four passengers died.

=== October ===
- 6 October – while carrying timber from Quebec to Liverpool the barque Oriental (United Kingdom) was found bottom up off Land's End with the loss of fifteen lives. When approximately sixty miles from the Smalls Lighthouse she was hit in the stern by a vessel which cut her in two and carried away her mizzen mast. The wreck was towed to Lamorna Cove by the tug Solva where some of her cargo was unloaded. Oriental Cottage in Lamorna was built with timbers from the wreck. 14 October according to Noall (1968).
- 7 October – the schooner Active (United Kingdom) carrying culm foundered twelve miles off Trevose Head in a WNW force 8 gale. One of her four crew died.
- 11 October – while carrying coal from Newport to Salcombe with coal Caroline became windbound in her home port. She left Padstow and while off Trevose Head her Captain went below instructing the Mate in charge he could pass either side of the Quies Rocks. The wind fell when she was landward of the rocks and she was carried on an ebb tide and became a total loss. The crew reached Padstow in the ship's boat.
- 21 October – the Mullion Cove lifeboat Daniel J Draper ( Royal National Lifeboat Institution) was launched for the first time to help save three lives from the Achilles which was wrecked at Pollurian.

== 1868 ==
=== January ===
- 7 January – the 300 ton coal carrying Atalanta (Norway) wrecked near Rinsey Head while bound for Barcelona with coal from Newcastle. Twelve drowned including all the crew and the Captain's family.

=== February ===
- 19 February – the lugger Jeune Joseph (France) was lost along with her crew of six and the cargo at Morwenstow.

=== May ===
- Unknown date – iron screw steamer Garonne (United Kingdom) of Liverpool bound from Bordeaux to her home port with wine, a general cargo and passengers hit one of the Bucks rocks near Lamorna Cove. Several of the female passengers and children were washed off the poop before the boats could be launched; three boats managed to get away although the Captain refused and went down with his ship. Four of the crew of 22 died as did 17 of the 19 passengers. Several of the crew escaped in the dinghy, which was full of green peas – ″a private speculation by the Captain″.

=== August ===
- 1 August – steam–tug Paragon passed between the shore and Godrevy Island and struck a rock. She was beached at Gwithian and became a total wreck, all the crew escaped.
- 22 August – 47 ton Fowey sloop Fancy (United Kingdom) carrying china stone from Par to Runcorn foundered off the Runnelstone in stormy weather. The crew was saved.

=== October ===
- 23 October – government lighter Devon en route to Queenstown from Devonport with stores steamed into the Brisons stern first. Seventeen drowned and one man, the mate George Davis, eventually rescued the next day by the Sennen Cove lifeboat Cousins William and Mary Ann of Bideford ( Royal National Lifeboat Institution).

=== December ===
- 6 December – an old softwood bluenose barque North Britain (United Kingdom) ran ashore on Long Rock beach. She was on a journey from Quebec with 950 tons of timber to her home port, Southampton. The lifeboat Richard Lewis ( Royal National Lifeboat Institution) capsized but still managed to save eight of the ship's crew. Five RNLI Silver Medals awarded.
- chasse–marée Bonaventure (France) wrecked at Godrevy.
- Newquay lifeboat Joshua II ( Royal National Lifeboat Institution) capsized while training.

== 1869 ==
- 30 January – the lifeboat Richard Lewis ( Royal National Lifeboat Institution) was carried over nine miles by road from Penzance to aid the Choice at Praa Sands.
- 20 March – brigantine The Lizzie of Newport went aground on the bar at Hayle. One life was lost and eight saved by Moses ( Royal National Lifeboat Institution) based at St Ives.
- 5 April – The 1,553 ton three masted sailing ship Nellie Harding, while in ballast, wrecked on Porthleven beach. The crew were saved by the rocket apparatus. A Porthleven man John Job was fined £5 plus 43s (equivalent to £2-15) costs for being in possession of wreck, the ship's bell.
- unknown date – brigantine Glynn sprang a leak in Hayle harbour and the five crew members were saved by the Hayle lifeboat ( Royal National Lifeboat Institution).
- 9 April – while in ballast from Plymouth to Waterford the Aura (United Kingdom) steamed into the Manacles.
- 9 June – the 39 ton dandy Francis and Mary (Jersey) sprang a leak and sank off the Bucks, near Lamorna Cove while carrying coal from Cardiff to Penzance. The crew escaped in the boat.
- brigantine Cornelia Maria (Netherlands) carrying 217 tons of china clay from Par and sprang a leak on the 13th. By the 16th there was six feet of water in her hold and her crew abandoned ship seven miles NW of Widemouth Bay. (Actual month not mentioned in source.) Scheduled Ancient Monument no. 1105579.
- unknown date – the Avonmore (United Kingdom) anchored off Sharp's Nose in the parish of Morwenstow where the captain ordered the three masts to be cut down. She drifted on to the rocks below Hawker's Hut close to Higher Sharpnose Point. Seven out of twenty-two crew died. She was en route from Cardiff to Montevideo with coal.

== 1870 ==
- 6 March – the Nantes lugger Jeune Xavier (France) envoyage from Swansea to Nantes with coal collided with the Plymouth schooner Elizabeth Mary (United Kingdom), also with coal from Cardiff to Penzance. Both crews landed at Penzance after their vessels foundered near the Runnelstone.
- October – all the crew of the 998 ton Geneva (Canada) of Quebec were lost when she hit the Stones reef in St Ives bay.
- October or November – schooner Sea Zebra (United Kingdom) struck a sandbank near Bude breakwater. Her crew of five were rescued from the rigging by breeches buoy.
- 30 November – Penzance boat Jane and Mary (United Kingdom) (ex Van Tromp) driven ashore and broke up on Chyandour rocks.
- unknown date – barquentine Bessie (United Kingdom) of St Ives heading for her home port from Baltimore drifted in the Atlantic for three weeks. The City of Tanjore rescued the crew and took them to Penzance.
