= Caledonia (1839 ship) =

Coordinates: 50.905°N 4.569°W

History

United Kingdom
- Name: Caledonia
- Owner: J. Esplin (1842)
- Builder: Built in Arbroath, Scotland
- Launched: 1839
- Fate: Wrecked 7 September 1842 on Sharpnose Point, near Morwenstow, Cornwall

General characteristics
- Tons burthen: 200, or 206 (bm)
- Sail plan: Brig

The Caledonia was a brig of some 200 tons (bm), built in Arbroath, Scotland, and wrecked on 7 September 1842 on Sharpnose Point, near Morwenstow, Cornwall.

== Final voyage ==
In September 1842 the Caledonia was homeward bound from Odesa, and called in at Falmouth to bury a crewman who had died of wounds suffered during a knife fight in Constantinople. The Caledonia then sailed for Gloucester to unload her cargo of wheat.

As she departed Falmouth a north-westerly gale was raging. At about 1 am on the morning of 8 September the ship's lookout saw waves breaking to leeward on Sharpnose Point, near Morwenstow, Cornwall.

Her captain, Stevenson Peter, shortened sail and tried to stand clear of the shore, but the ship refused to come up and soon hit the rocks at Sharpnose Point. As they hit, the captain ordered the crew to climb into the rigging, but the mast collapsed, throwing them into the sea where they all died. The sole survivor was Edward Le Dain from Jersey, who managed to get ashore when a farmer discovered him at dawn. He was taken to the local Rectory where the Reverend Robert Stephen Hawker ensured that he was cared for and nursed back to health. Later Le Dain sent the best Jersey cow he could find in gratitude. He also named his son Edward Robert Hawker Le Dain born in 1854, and made Hawker and his wife godparents.

== Aftermath ==
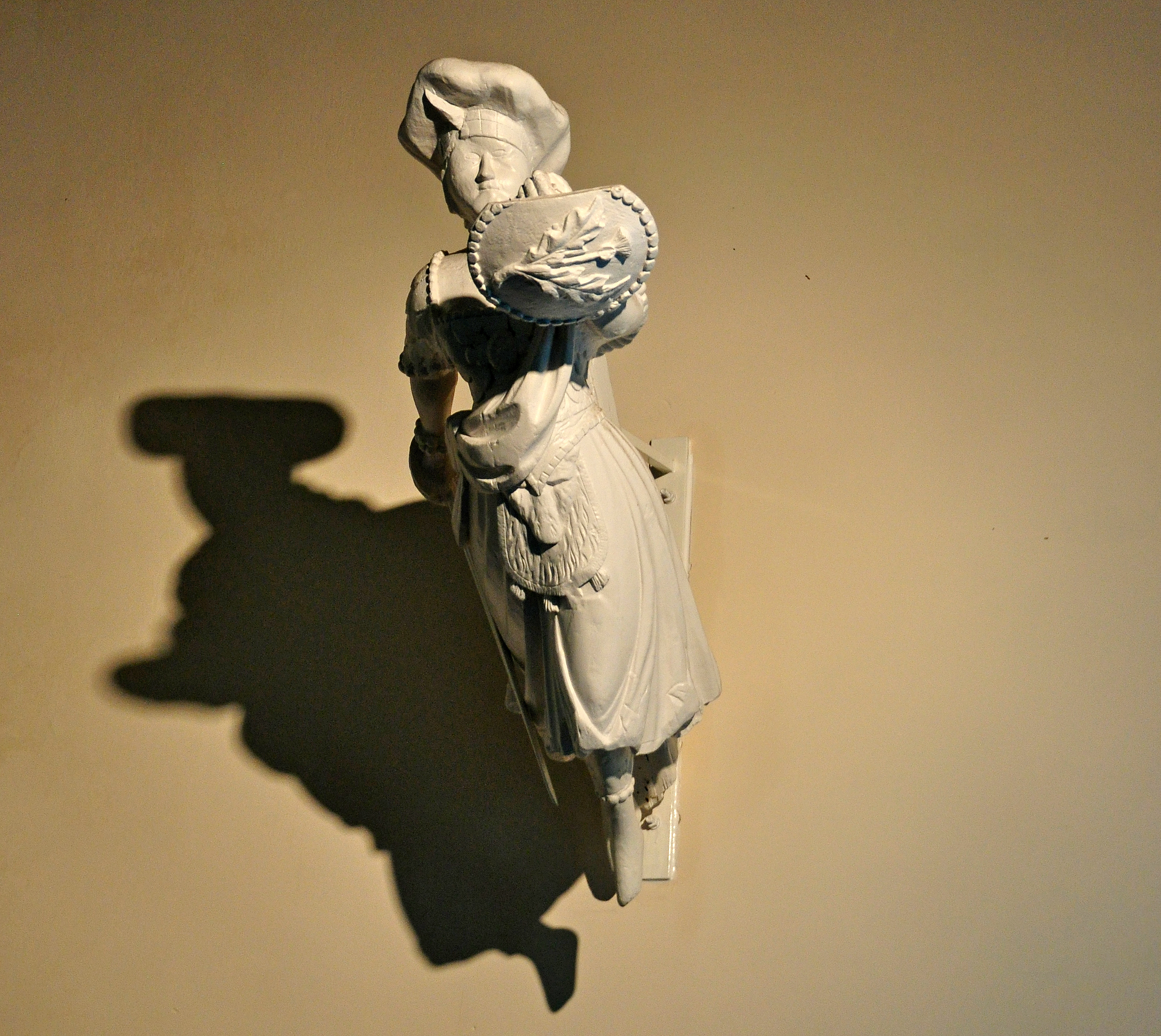
Conserved figurehead inside Morwenstow church

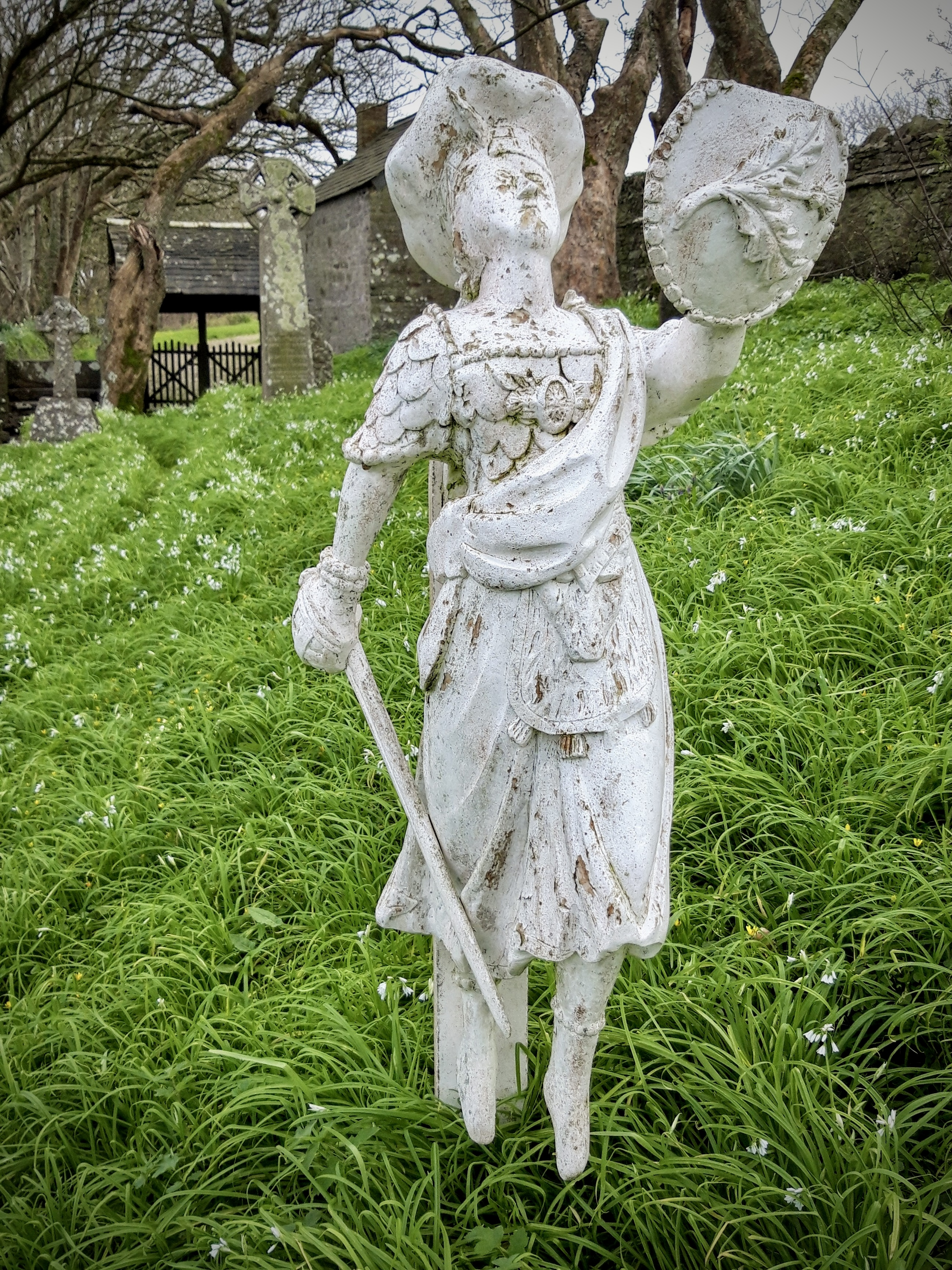
Replica figurehead in Morwenstow church yard.

The bodies of the other crewmen eventually washed up on the beach and were buried in Morwenstow Churchyard. For some 162 years the white, carved pitch-pine figurehead of the brig was preserved in the churchyard as the headstone of the ship's captain and crew. During that time it was subjected to occasional minor repairs and countless layers of white paint. In 2004 it was found that the passage of time and the often harsh Atlantic weather had taken their toll, so it was removed for a prolonged drying out process, followed by scientific paint analysis and a major restoration. To fund this work, an appeal called The Caledonia Conservation Fund was launched by the Morwenstow Parochial Church Council. The decision was made to mount the restored figurehead within the Church, and to create a more weather-resilient replica as the grave marker for the shipwrecked sailors. A service of dedication for the newly installed figurehead and grave marker was held at Morwenstow Parish Church on Sunday, 7 September 2008—the 166th anniversary of the tragedy. It was preceded by a brief act of commemoration held at the top cliff overlooking the shipwreck site, with a piper leading the way across the fields to the Church. The large congregation included nine descendants of Edward Le Dain (the lone survivor), two descendants of seaman Alexander Kent (one of the victims), several Hawker descendants, enthusiasts and scholars, and many local people and holidaymakers.

Remarkably, in 1957 a message in a bottle from one of the seamen was washed ashore between Babbacombe and Peppercombe in Devon. The letter, dated 15 August 1843 read:

"Dear Brother, Please e God i be with y against Michaelmas. Prepare y search Lundy for y Jenny ivories. Adiue William, Odessa".

The bottle and letter are on display at the Portledge Hotel at Fairy Cross, in Devon, England. The Jenny was a three-masted schooner wrecked on Lundy (at a place there after called Jenny's Cove) on 20 February 1797. The ivory was recovered some years later, but bags that weresupposed to contain gold were never found.

== In literature ==
An 1842 poem by Robert Stephen Hawker, "The Figure-Head of the Caledonia at her Captain's Grave" commemorates the shipwreck.
