= Eastcott, Cornwall =

Hamlet in Cornwall, England

Coordinates: 50.916°N 4.490°W

Eastcott: Cornish: Bos an Est
- Hamlet
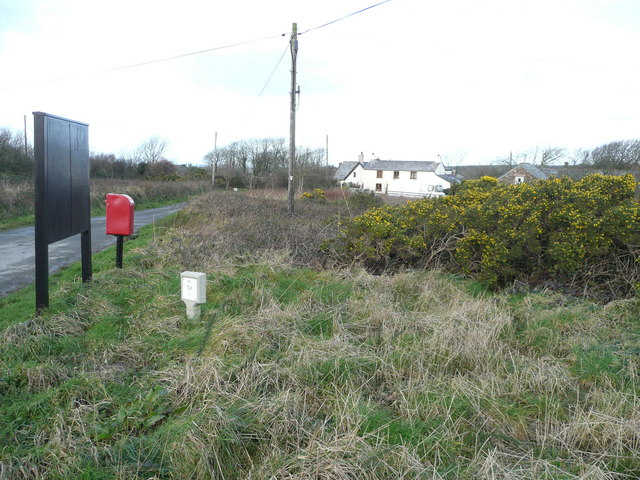
- Common land at Eastcott

- Location within Cornwall
- Unitary authority: Cornwall
- Region: South West
- Country: England
- Sovereign state: United Kingdom
- Police: Devon and Cornwall
- Fire: Cornwall
- Ambulance: South Western

Eastcott (Cornish: Bos an Est, meaning dwelling of the east) is a hamlet 6 miles (9.7 km) north-east of Bude in Cornwall, England. The hamlet is 1 mile (1.6 km) east of Gooseham in the civil parish of Morwenstow and lies within the Cornwall Area of Outstanding Natural Beauty (AONB).
