= Church of St Morwenna and St John the Baptist, Morwenstow =

Coordinates: 50.9093°N 4.5545°W

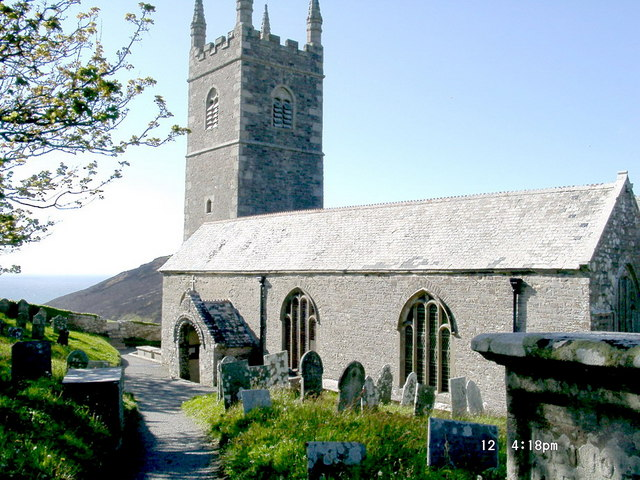
- Church from the southeast

- Location in Cornwall
- OS grid reference: SS 199 153
- Location: Morwenstow, Cornwall
- Country: England
- Denomination: Anglican
- Website: St Morwenna and St John the Baptist

History
- Status: Parish church
- Dedication: Morwenna, John the Baptist

Architecture
- Functional status: Active
- Architect: J. P. St Aubyn (probable) Restoration
- Architectural type: Church
- Style: Norman, Gothic, Gothic Revival

Specifications
- Materials: Rubble with granite dressings Slate roofs

Administration
- Province: Canterbury
- Diocese: Truro
- Archdeaconry: Bodmin
- Deanery: Stratton
- Parish: Morwenstow

Listed Building – Grade I
- Official name: Church of St Morwenna and St John the Baptist
- Designated: 29 September 1961
- Reference no.: 1141774

The Church of St Morwenna and St John the Baptist is the parish church of Morwenstow, north Cornwall, England, United Kingdom, the most northerly parish in Cornwall. The church is dedicated to Morwenna, a local saint, and to John the Baptist, and is recorded in the National Heritage List for England as a designated Grade I listed building. It is an active Anglican parish church in the diocese of Truro, the archdeaconry of Bodmin, and the deanery of Stratton. Its benefice is combined with that of St James Church, Kilkhampton to form the United Benefice of Kilkhampton with Morwenstow.

From 1835 to 1874 the vicar of the parish was Rev. R. S. Hawker, poet and antiquary who is credited with creating the modern form of the harvest festival church service to give thanks for a good harvest in 1842.

The church stands in a remote position near cliffs on the north coast of Cornwall. Amongst the tombs and gravestones in the churchyard is a replica of the figurehead from a ship which was wrecked nearby in 1842. Since 2008 the original (conserved) wooden figurehead has been displayed inside the church.

The Church of St Morwenna and St John the Baptist is the most northerly church (and parish) in Cornwall.

== History ==
Although the earliest fabric in the present church is Norman, it is believed that an earlier Saxon church stood on the site. At some time before 1291 the advowson was granted to St John's Hospital at Bridgwater by the Bishop of Exeter. In a document dated 1296, the church was referred to as an "old and well-known structure". Additions to the church were made in the 13th, 15th and 16th centuries.

The church was restored in the 1850s under the direction of Parson Hawker when the box pews were removed and the wooden shingles on the roof were replaced. A further restoration took place in, or just after 1878, probably by J P St Aubyn. A vestry was added in 1887 and there were further restorations in 1904 and 1908. The colouring of the chancel roof was restored in 1934.

== Architecture ==
=== Exterior ===
The church is built in stone with 19th-century slate roofs. Most of the stone is rubble but some dressed stone is present. The arcades dating from the 12th and 13th centuries are made from local dunstone, the 15th-century arcade is constructed from Polyphant stone, and the 16th-century piers and arches are in granite. The plan of the church consists of a west tower, a nave and chancel, five-bay north and south arcades, a south porch and a northeast vestry.

The tower has three stages. It is built in rubble with granite for the long and short quoins, the string course, embattled parapet, and the tall corner pinnacles with crocketted finials. The doorway to the porch consists of the outer order of a Norman doorway which has been moved from elsewhere. It includes zigzag carving and flowers carved in heavy relief. The doorway to the church itself consists of the inner two orders of the Norman doorway with zigzag carving on both orders. On the capitals are carved birds and pine cones.

=== Interior ===
Internally the westerly three bays of the north arcade are Norman and include zigzag carving and a carved ram's head. The two easterly arcades are Transitional. The south arcade is mainly Perpendicular in style. The pew ends are carved with Gothic tracery above Renaissance arabesques. One pew end is inscribed with "T.K.", for Rev Thomas Kempthorne, who was vicar from 1539 to 1594; another has the date of 1575. The Norman font is roughly shaped with ropework decoration beneath a plain bowl.

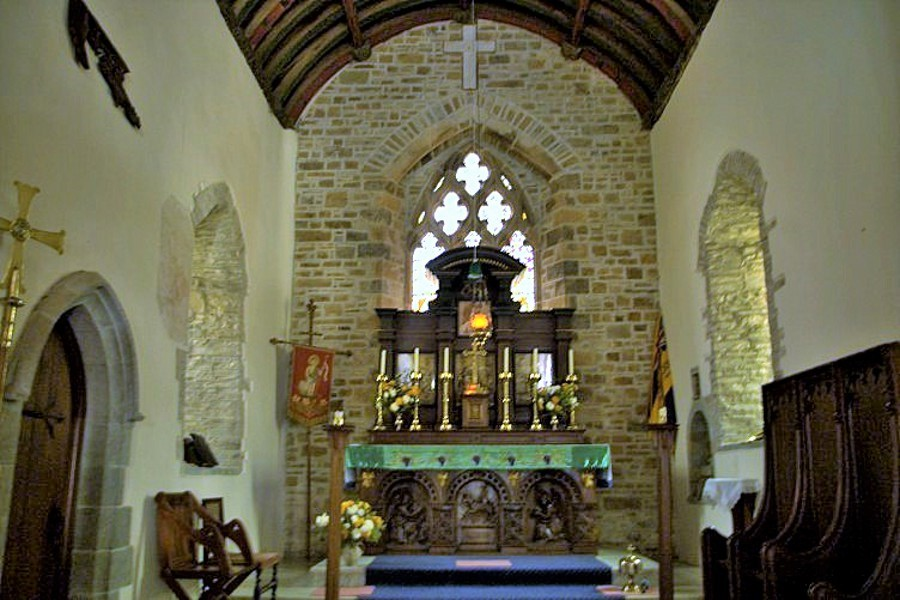
Sedding's design and Pinwill sisters' work in the chancel

The pulpit dates from the 20th century and incorporates some earlier woodwork as blind tracery. The chancel screen which was initially constructed by Parson Hawker was removed after his death and then replaced in 1908. It is made from fragments of 16th and 17th carving. In the chancel is a large reredos dated 1908 which was designed by E. H. Sedding and carved by the Pinwill sisters of Plymouth, probably Violet Pinwill. It contains a cartoon by Giovanni Battista Piazzetta and three engravings by John-Baptist Jackson.

In the south wall of the chancel is a piscina and on the north wall is a fragment of a mural painting dating from the late 15th or early 16th century. The painting depicts a female holding a scroll in her left hand with her right arm raised in blessing over a kneeling monk and is thought to represent St Morwenna.

In the church are a number of tomb chests and memorials. One of the memorials is a large slate plate in the floor beside the pulpit to the memory of Hawker's first wife, Charlotte, who died in 1863. At the west end of the church is a 17th-century communion table. In the south aisle is the Hawker memorial window by Lavers and Westlake which was erected in 1904. It depicts Parson Hawker and his dog, the church and various other features associated with him.

=== Organ ===
The organ was built by J. W. Walker & Sons Ltd of London in 1892 and rebuilt by Geo. Osmond of Taunton in 1969.

=== Bells ===
There is a ring of six bells. Four of these were cast by Abel Rudhall in 1753, the other two being by Mears & Stainbank of the Whitechapel Bell Foundry dated 1902.

== External features ==
Associated with the church are a number of structures listed at Grades II* and II. In the churchyard are a number of headstones and tomb chests.

Celtic Cross

Also in the churchyard is a granite Celtic cross which is said to have been moved from a nearby moor by Parson Hawker to commemorate the death of his first wife, Charlotte. Her initials C E H are carved on the shaft.

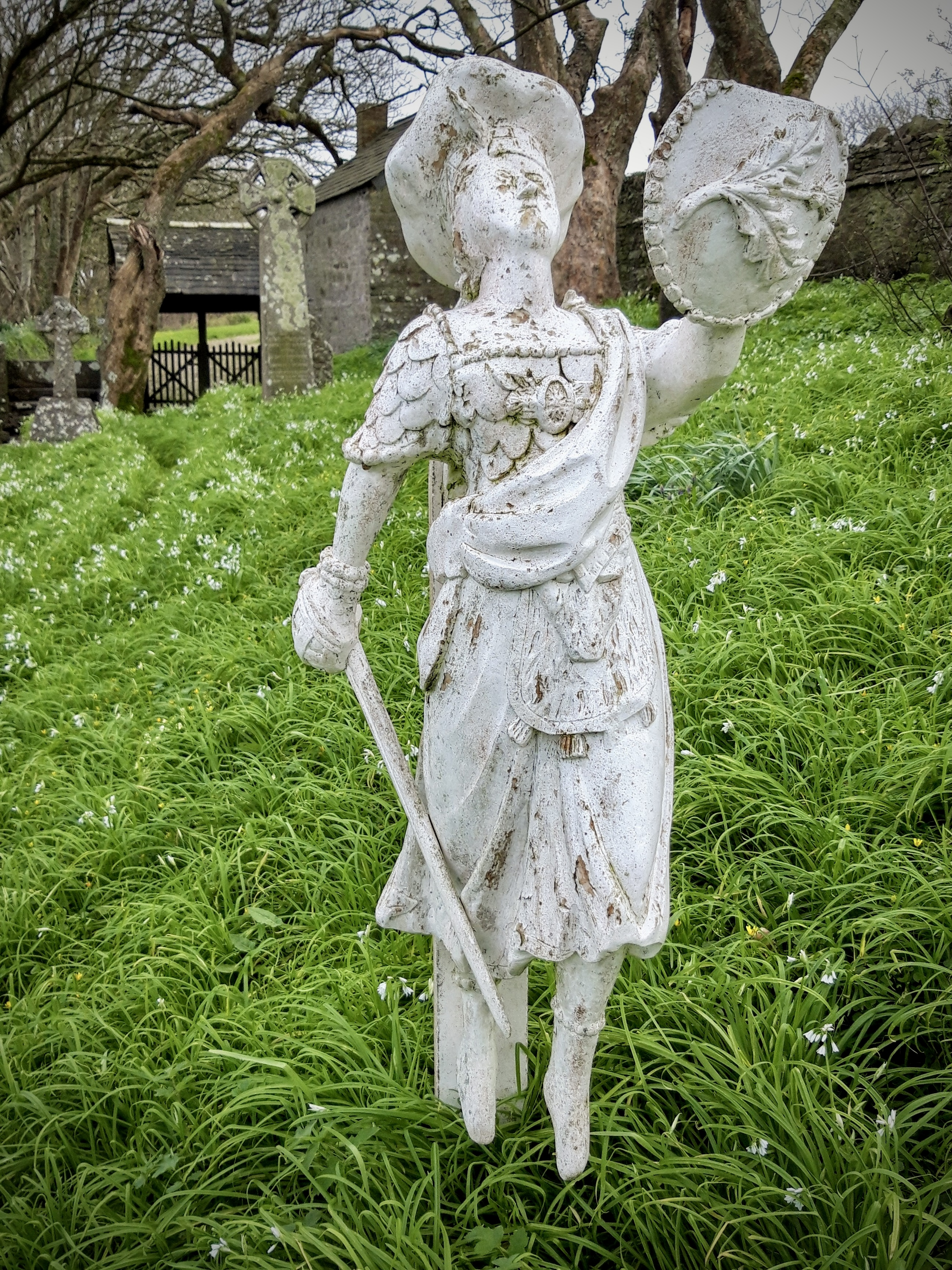
Replica figurehead

Elsewhere in the churchyard is a replica of a carved and painted wooden figurehead depicting the figure of Caledonia holding a drawn sword and shield. It was the figurehead from the Scottish brig Caledonia, which was shipwrecked off Morwenstow in September 1842 and is erected to the memory of its captain and crew who are buried nearby.

At the entry to the churchyard are an adjoining stile, a lychgate and a former mortuary. The stile dates from the 19th century. It is constructed in freestone ashlar and slate and was probably designed by Parson Hawker. The lychgate, which is wooden with a slate roof, was built in 1641 and extensively repaired in 1738. The former mortuary, which is now used as a store, is a stone building which was used for laying out the corpses of drowned sailors.

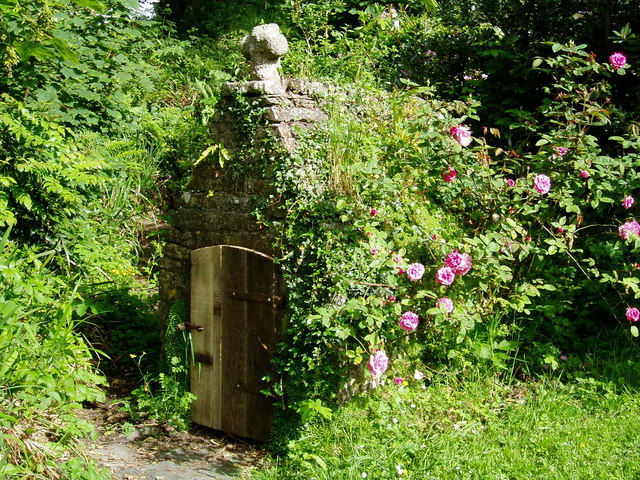
St John's Well

In a corner of the vicarage garden about 125 metres from the church is the holy well of St John over which is a medieval well house; its water has been used for baptisms for hundreds of years. This is a rectangular stone building with a timber door and a steeply gabled stone roof with a flat ridge. Further from the church, to its west, and 14 metres down the cliff face is the holy well of St Morwenna. Its well house also originates from the medieval period and it consists of a dressed stone-gabled structure built into the side of the cliff.

Nearby on the coast path is Hawker's Hut, constructed by Parson Hawker from driftwood. It is owned and managed by the National Trust.
