= Robert Hawker =

British priest

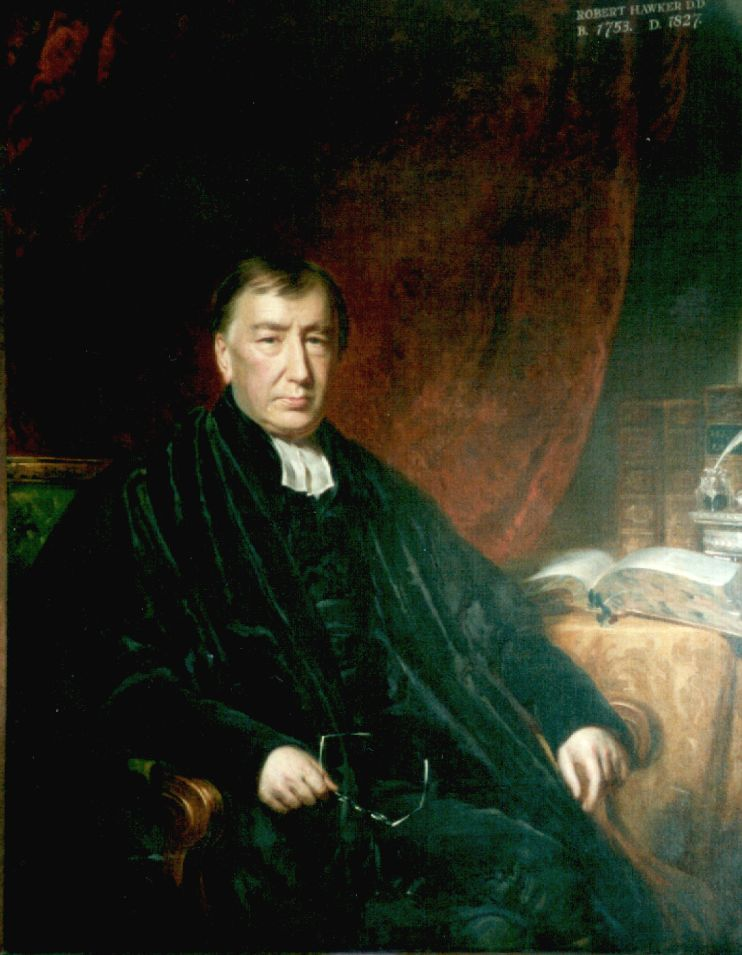
Portrait of Dr Robert Hawker, the most famous Vicar of the Charles Church

Robert Hawker (1753–1827) was an Anglican priest in Devon, vicar of Charles Church, Plymouth. Called "Star of the West" for his popular preaching, he was known as an evangelical and author. The Cornish poet Robert Stephen Hawker was his grandson.

== Early life ==
Hawker was born in Exeter in 1753 to Jacob Hawker, a surgeon in Exeter. He was married aged 19 to Anna Rains, They had eight children altogether.

Hawker studied medicine in Plymouth under Samuel White of Bretonside, and joined the Royal Marines as assistant surgeon. In 1778 he entered Magdalen College, Oxford.

He served as a curate in Plymouth and then became vicar there in 1784, serving until his death in 1827.

He preached in London every year and launched an early Sunday School hymn book; he also published the “Poor Man” series of commentaries at a low price, so that anyone could afford to buy them.

== Partial list of works by Robert Hawker ==
- Sermons on the Divinity of Christ. London, 1792.
- Sermons on the Divinity and Operations of the Holy Ghost. Bath, 1794.
- An Appeal to the People of England on the . . . French Revolution. 1794.
- Paracelsus, or Conflations for a Dying Hour, from a review of the evidences of the renewed life. London, 1797.
- Zion's Pilgrim. Falmouth, 1801.
- Zion's Warrior, or the Christian Soldier's Manual. 1802.
- The Sailor Pilgrim. 2nd edition. London [1806?].
- Life and Writings of the Rev. Henry Tanner of Exeter. London, 1807.
- The Poor Man's Morning Portion, being a selection of a verses of Scripture, with short observations, for every day in the year. 2nd edition. London, 1809.
- The Poor Man's Concordance and Dictionary to the Sacred Scriptures. London: J. Nisbet, 1812.
- The Poor Man's Concordance and Dictionary to the Sacred Scriptures. London: Ebenezer Palmer, 1828.
- The Poor Man's Evening Portion. 4th ed. 1819.
- The Poor Man's Commentary on the New Testament. 4 vols., London, 1816.
- Visits to and from Jesus upon the most interesting occasions, and in the most hallowed moments of life. London, 1816.
- Lectures on the Person, Godhead, and Ministry of the Holy Ghost. Plymouth [1817].
- The Poor Man's Commentary on the Old Testament. 6 vols., London, 1822.
- The Portrait of an English Bishop of the Sixteenth Century. 2nd edition, London, 1829.
- Life of Dr. T. Goodwin. 1838.
- A Concordance and Dictionary to the Sacred Scriptures, both of the Old and New Testament. new edition, London, 1844.
- A Concordance and Dictionary to the Sacred Scriptures, both of the Old and New Testament. new edition, London, 1846.

His collected Works was published in 10 volumes in 1831.
