= Charles Church, Plymouth =

Church in Devon, England

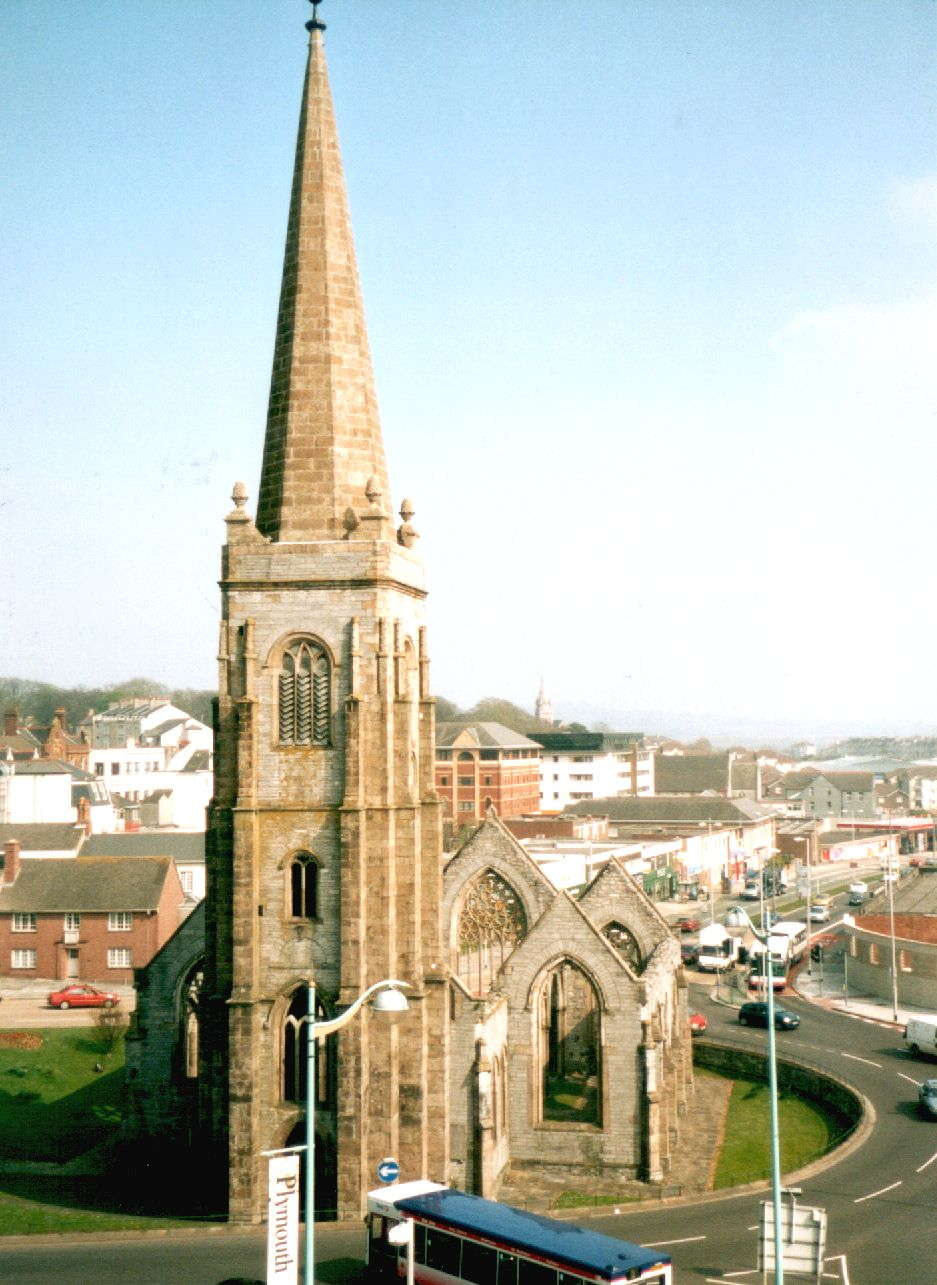
- Charles Church, May 2002

- Location within Plymouth
- 50°22′18″N 4°08′09″W
- OS grid reference: SX 48216 54605
- Location: Plymouth, Devon
- Country: England
- Denomination: Church of England

History
- Founded: c. 1640
- Dedication: Charles I of England

Architecture
- Functional status: derelict
- Heritage designation: Grade I listed
- Designated: 25 January 1954
- Style: Gothic Survival

Administration
- Diocese: Diocese of Exeter

Charles Church is a now derelict church in the UK. It was the second oldest parish church in Plymouth, Devon, England.

== Overview ==
The church was founded around 1640, but not completed for many years. It is a Gothic style church, consisting of a west tower, with spire, a nave with north and south aisles, north and south porches, and a chancel with vestry. The tower was completed in 1708, and the original wooden/lead covered spire was replaced by a stone spire in 1766.

During the nights of 21 and 22 March 1941, the church was entirely burned out by incendiary bombs during the Plymouth Blitz. When World War II ended it was decided not to rebuild the church. In 1958, at a service conducted by the vicar of the parish, J Allen James, the church was dedicated as a memorial for the 1,200 civilian deaths in air raids.

There have been several histories written about the church; most of them focus on the fabric of the building rather than the spiritual life of the church and ministers.

== Significance ==
The church was an important centre of spiritual life for the city for 300 years as it was the mother of many younger churches and boasted a number of important clergy. Although the building is now a monument, the tradition of ministry at "Charles" is not lost and is carried on by the Parish of Charles with St Matthias, one of its daughter churches. It is an important landmark for the city of Plymouth. St Andrew's Church is now the mother church of Plymouth.

== History ==
=== Legal founding (1634–1641) ===
In 1634, the mayor and thirty members of the council assembled and passed a resolution to petition King Charles I, for permission to divide the old Parish of Plymouth into two and build a second church.

The reason for a second church was not that the existing Church of St Andrew was too small (it could comfortably seat 1,200 and the population was around 8,000 at the time), but rather one of religious controversy. Plymouth had grown into a Puritan town. This is hinted at by the Pilgrim fathers who felt at home here, "kindly entertained and courteously used by divers friends there dwelling". Theological differences between the Anglican Church and the mainly Presbyterian Puritan clergy meant that the High Anglican king did not see eye to eye with the townsfolk on religious matters.

Tensions grew between the king and the town over St Andrew's. In addition to the minister the town regularly appointed a "lecturer" to supplement the minister in his ministry. This lecturer might listen to the minister's morning sermon and refute it in his own evening sermon. Battles were fought over the choice of ministers for the church and at times the king ordered the town's choice to be refused admission or tried to appoint his own lecturer.

This tension led to King Charles to ignore the request for a second church for seven years. Eventually Robert Trelawny, who had become Member of Parliament for Plymouth (and despite his royalist sympathy) persuaded the king to act. On 21 April 1641 the letters patent were signed and sealed. An Act of Parliament was passed on 6 July 1641 and given royal assent on 7 August. It cost the town £150.

The old parish was split in two and the new parish was to the east; The King insisted the church be named after himself. St Andrew's came to be known as "the Old church" and Charles Church "the New church", titles that stuck for a long time. The Act stipulated that no clergyman could hold both livings.

The plot of land first sited close to Sutton Pool was unsuitable as the extended parish boundaries would make it less accessible, so a second plot of 1-acre (4,000 m^{2}) was found and given to the church by a William Warren who received both a burial plot inside the church and a seat inside. It was well located for the houses of the parish and fairly close to the ruins of a 12th-century Carmelite monastery.

=== Building work (1641–1904) ===
Building commenced immediately in 1641 but was halted the following by the English Civil War as men were needed for the defence of the town. The church remained in that state until 1645 when the town was relieved; staunchly Protestant, Plymouth sided with Oliver Cromwell and the Parliamentarians; it held out against the King's men throughout the Civil War, almost alone in a Royalist West Country.

There is evidence that the incomplete church was used for stabling horses during the siege. However, it appears that some parts were used for worship. A wedding is recorded on 10 May 1644, baptisms from January 1645 and burials from 4 August 1646 (some pages have been lost so there may have been earlier ones). The oldest communion plate is hallmarked 1646. Although the church was not consecrated until 2 September 1665, the first minister (Francis Porter) was in place as the preaching minister from 1643. A glance at the map of the besieged city in 1643 reveals that the church is marked but without a roof on the plan.

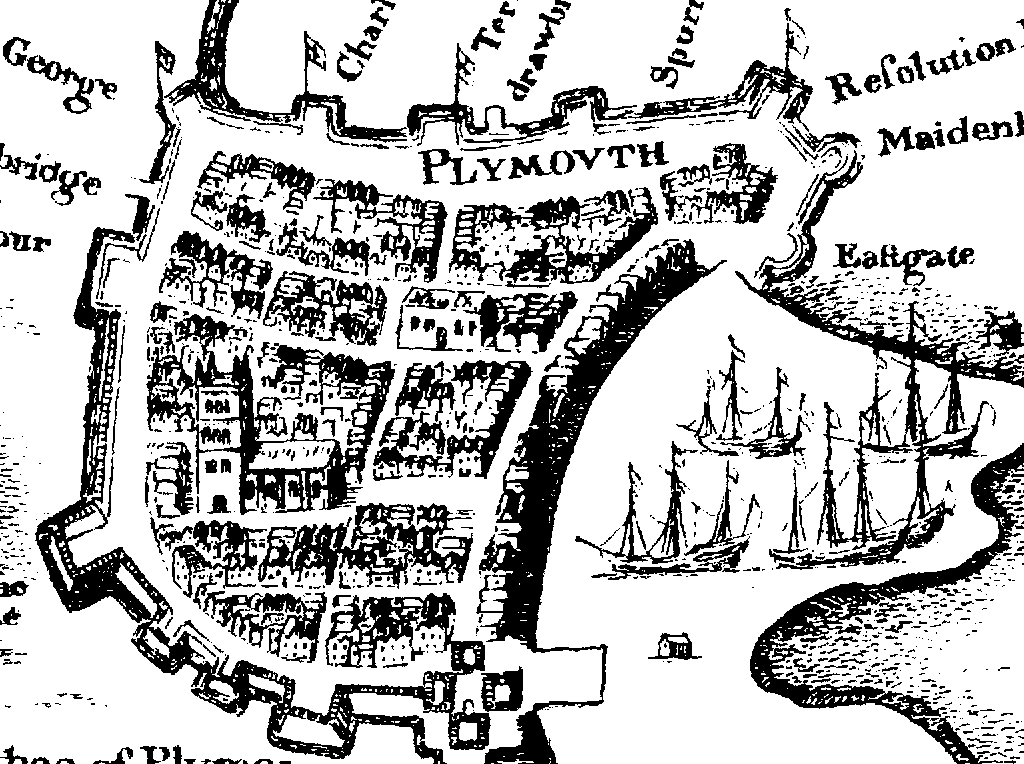
Detail of map of Plymouth, Devon circa 1600. Note that the Church has no roof.

After the war, work began again, albeit slowly due to financial difficulties. Eventually, the church was finished in 1657 although a spire was not added until 1708 and the tower covered in a cap of wood instead. Once complete the church stood out from the city. It was one of the leading examples of a post-Reformation Gothic style church in the country. The architect was thought to be a disciple of William of Wykeham.

The conveyancing happened very shortly before the consecration twenty-four years after the church was started. Francis Porter, who was Presbyterian, conformed and kept his living and the church was consecrated by Bishop Seth Ward of Exeter on 2 September 1665 (after the restoration of the monarchy). In 1670 the churchyard was consecrated. The consecration caused a little controversy as the bishop wanted to dedicate the church to "Charles, King and Martyr". The Puritans insisted the church be named according to the letters Patent of 1641 signed in Charles's own hand. (The bishop succeeded in dedicating the Church of King Charles the Martyr in nearby Falmouth.)

Francis Porter died in 1675. There followed four ministers until Thomas Martin. Martin completed the tower with a wooden spire coated with lead (replaced in 1767 with a stone spire).

Towards the end of the 18th century Dr Robert Hawker became the church's minister. He was an Evangelical, and was extremely popular as a preacher. The church expanded in numbers and galleries were created in 1815, with the first daughter church, Charles Chapel, also being built at that time.

Charles Church was a Gothic styled church. It consisted of a west tower, with spire; nave with north and south aisles; north and south porches and chancel with north vestry. The tower was completed in 1708 and was originally surmounted by a wooden lead covered spire. This was later to be blown off in strong winds and replaced by the stone spire in 1766. It was said at the time that witches had knocked the wooded spire off with their broomsticks.

In 1708 the West Gallery was erected. Six bells were added to the church in 1709 and a chiming clock was given in 1719.

The porches were added to the church in 1864. The south porch, located in the centre of the south aisle had a 17th-century pointed outer doorway – this is still visible today in the ruins of the church. The fire caused by the blitz revealed a doorway in the north wall of the church.

List of Alterations and Restorations (slightly abridged)
1787	Sunday school begun by Dr Hawker
1796	Lower churchyard paved and walled
1798	Foundation of "Household of Faith" school laid
1815	North and South galleries erected
1816	New pulpit
1824	Higher West Burial ground opened
1828	Alterations – new pulpit, new west gallery, new fronts to gallery, new pews
1832	Higher East Burial ground opened
1846	Organ erected
1851	Tower and spire repaired
1864	Church entirely renovated – new porches, staircases, reredos, east windows, gas standards
1869	Four windows inserted in north and south walls
1872	Windows inserted in the south aisle in memory
1876	New gates and piers near vestry
1884	Churchyard alterations complete
1887	Restoration of church approved
1888	Removal of pews and chairs substituted, north and south galleries removed, window erected in north aisle
1889	Northwest porch finished
1889	Windows inserted in north aisle in memory
1891	Window inserted in northwest porch in memory
1893	New vestry erected
1898	Eight bells in steeple rehung and two treble bells given
1901	Restoration of the organ
1904	Erection of the memorial hall

=== Attendance figures in 1851 ===
The 1851 church census gives us some idea of what a normal attendance would have been like although it is by no means accurate. On 30 March 1851 the attendances were:

Results of 1851 census
Church	Morning	Afternoon	Evening
Charles Church
Adults	823	296	935
Children	213	213	---
St Andrew's Church – Note: 1,400 free and 1000 other seats
Adults	1,600	1,000	1,600
Children	200	---	---
Charles Chapel (St Luke's the daughter church)
Adults	500	---	500/600
Children	---	---	---

- Plymouth combined returns
- Population: 52,221
- Percentage sittings per person: 45.6%
- Number of sittings: 23,805
- Additional sitting required to seat 58% population: 6,483

From the figures it is clear that the Charles Chapel and St Andrew's figures are estimated and little care was taken over them (if they were returned at all and not estimated by the census makers). The Charles figures have a ring of authenticity about them and this may indicate that they are accurate.

The question of how many sittings Charles had is difficult to arrive at. The church had three galleries in addition to its pews. The church is approximately half the size of St Andrew's. A figure of 900 sittings is given by the one author in 1977 although this is not clear whether or not all the galleries were taken into account. Charles Church was popular and may have been full that morning. Nationally there were a large number of absences on that day so we must presume that the church could seat over 1,000.

On the day of the census there was a total of 2,480 attendances. This is probably made up of a large number of "twicers". In 1827 it was estimated that the parishioners numbered 10,000 and it was clear that there was a need for more churches.

=== Expansion of daughter churches (1829–1910) ===
The Victorian period was a boom time for the church building. The 1851 census discovered a need for more sitting (the 58% population noted above). Nationally the population grew from 19 million in 1861 to 30.5 million in 1901. This population growth was in the towns and not in the country. The need became apparent for more churches to meet the spiritual needs of increasing numbers parishioners. People started moving out from the centre of the towns to the suburbs and Plymouth was no exception as the population increased steadily from the early 18th century to 1814. As Charles parish extended a great distance anyway there was a large increase in population.

The Daughter churches of Charles
1 July 1829	St Luke's (Charles Chapel)
21 June 1855	St John Sutton-on-Plym
19 September 1870	Emmanuel
27 November 1876	St Jude
25 October 1887	St Matthias (now Charles with St Matthias)
15 October 1904	St Augustine
26 September 1907	St Simon
26 July 1910	St Gabriel

Charles Church went on to seed eight daughter churches from 1829 through to 1910. The first came about following the death of Hawker. His curate Septimus Courtney was expected by the congregation to become priest, but he was succeeded by James Carne. A protest meeting resulted in the building of the first daughter church of Charles in 1827 called Charles Chapel (later it became a parish and was renamed St Luke's).

The church, under the influence of the evangelicals, was extremely active, and many new church buildings and alternations were made in this time. Charles is no exception and a large number of developments and restorations were made to the building during that period.

=== Missions and Education ===
On 17 October 1661, the church took a collection of monies which was given to John de Kavino Kavainsley of the Dukedom of Lithuania, for the printing of the Bible in Lithuanian.

In 1896 the "Charles Own Missionary" Fund was started and the first "Own Missionary", Miss Emily Bazerley, went out to the Bihar and Orissa province of India. In January 1901 the second missionary, Miss Ada Pitts, sailed for China. In 1961 a third "Own Missionary", Dr Alison Dow went out with CMS to the Bihls in India.

Education was important to Charles Church and its evangelical ministers. The "Household of Faith" Sunday school started in May 1784 with twenty children. This was the first school of its type in Plymouth. In 1788, a school of industry was added. The first permanent building for the school was opened on 7 March 1798; it is possible that this was the first purpose-built Sunday school building in the world.

The Charles National school in Tavistock Place was built in 1837. This was to be a mixed school but became a Junior mixed and senior girls when Charles Shaftesbury school was opened in 1855 serving Senior boys.

== Clergy ==
Charles Church had over 25 clergy. Some of the more notable were:

- Francis Porter (1643–1675). The first preacher at Charles Church.
- Abednego Seller (1686–1690). Following the Glorious Revolution in 1688 Archbishop Sancroft was the first to refuse to take the oath of allegiance to William III. Seller was one of the seven other bishops and four hundred clergy who become "Non-Jurors" and similarly lost his living.
- Thomas Martin (1690–1711) was an Irishman who fled Ireland for safety "from ye bloody rage of ye Irish Papists". Little is known of his spiritual activities in the church, but he was instrumental in building the west gallery, finishing the tower and raising the spire.
- Walter Hewgoe (1711–1712) was controversial. "A very good man in every way" he was regarded as the best man for the appointment. However, there was some delay in the appointment and the Mayor took matters into his own hands. Whilst the majority of the council was out of town the Mayor and eight others chose Hewgoe. The rest of the council was not pleased and the matter went to trial before the bishop's court with the result that he was instituted as vicar. The Mayor, the Bishop and Hewgoe were sued and in the end Hewgoe resigned the living.
- Robert Hawker (1784–1827) was the most famous minister of Charles Church. He was sometimes called the "Star of the West", due to his superlative preaching that drew thousands to hear him speak for over an hour at a time. He was a bold Evangelical, caring father, active in education, compassionate for the poor and needy of the parish, a scholar and author of many books, and deeply beloved of his parishioners. At the time of his death in 1827, Hawker had been curate for six years and 43 years its incumbent.
- James Carne (1827–1832) undertook extensive repairs to the church. He was said to "combine the meekness of wisdom and the watchfulness of the Christian pastor". He and his wife died within four days of each other whilst ministering to poor and deprived families who contracted cholera in the epidemic of 1832.
- Septimus Courtney (1832–1843). When Hawker died, he was the curate and widely tipped to be the next pastor. The nearby Charles chapel (later St Luke's) was built for him instead. It was said of him that "he made the glory of Christ known and His redemption great subjects of his ministry, and while he laboured diligently in the public preaching of the Gospel, he exemplified his life the doctrines which he taught".
- Cecil Augustus Bisshopp (1845–1846) exercised his right as patron of the living and was instituted at the age of twenty-four. The previous minister Charles Greenal Davies was a stopgap minister until Bisshopp was old enough to take the living. Bisshopp was remembered as a charming young man who led a blameless life. He resigned early as he and his wife had ill-health. He moved to Malta where he died aged twenty-eight.
- Henry Addington Greaves (1846–1878) restored the spire and tower and conducted other building work. He also initiated the creation of three daughter churches, St John's, Emmanuel, and St Jude's. At this time Charles Chapel became St Luke's Church with its own parish.

== Destruction and recent history 1941–2002 ==
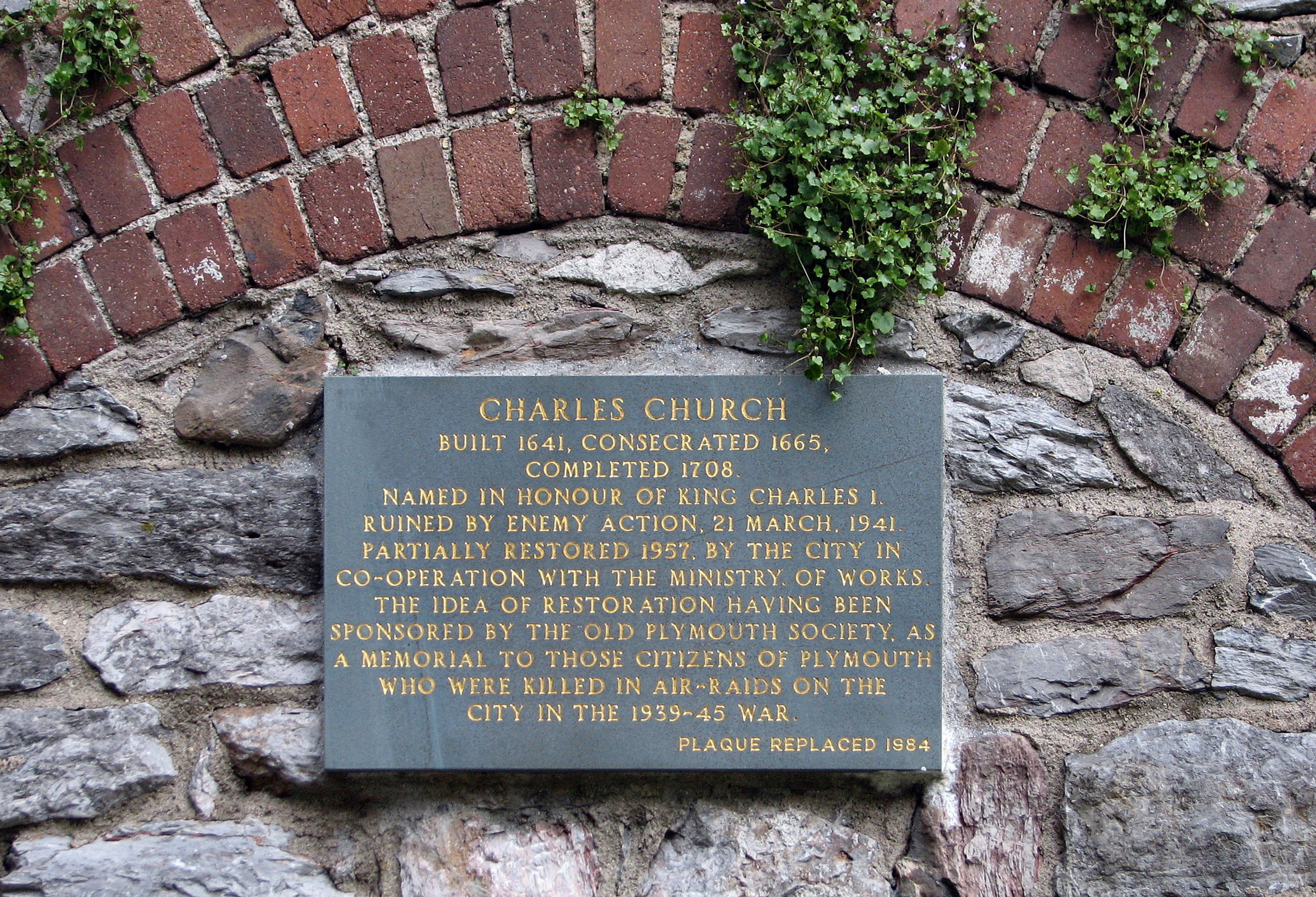
The commemorative plaque (replaced in 1984)

After the Battle of Britain phase of World War II, the air raids on Plymouth were rapidly intensified. During the night of 20–21 March 1941 Charles Church was destroyed by fire. The congregation joined St Luke's for a month and then joined the daughter church St Matthias (as did the daughter church St Augustine for the same reason). Charles Church was encircled by the construction of a roundabout ten years later.

When WWII ended it was decided not to rebuild Charles. Plymouth had expanded and most of the population was in the new suburbs rather than the city centre. It was decided to turn Charles into a living memorial of the 1,200 civilian deaths in the air raids. On Saturday 1958 at a service conducted by the vicar of the parish, J Allen James, the church was dedicated as a memorial. The commemorative plaque on the north wall reads:

Charles Church

Built 1641, consecrated 1665, completed 1708. Named in honour of King Charles I. Ruined by enemy action, 21 March 1941. Partially restored 1957, by the City in co-operation with the Ministry of Works.

The idea of restoration having been sponsored by the Old Plymouth Society, as a memorial to those citizens of Plymouth who were killed in air-raids on the city in the 1939-45 War.

The church is occasionally used for services of remembrance or of special importance and the current Vicar of Charles with St Matthias is responsible for them. Modern use has been for the university carol concerts and a special service of reconciliation between Germany and Plymouth was held there in 2001 with the German ambassador present.

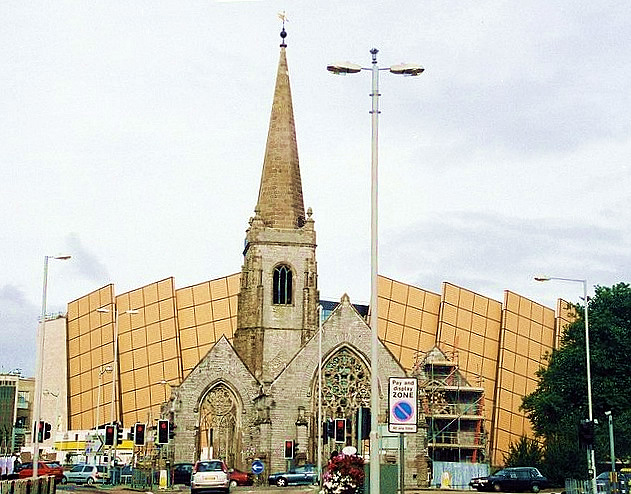
Charles Church with Drake Circus Shopping Centre behind, 2006

The parish became known as the Charles with St Luke on 11 August 1954. When St Luke's was considered for demolition the congregation united with St Matthias becoming "the Church of Charles with St Matthias" on 22 April 1962.

One of the parishioners, Miss Leigh, had mixed feelings about the church remaining a memorial. "It grieves my heart to see it as it is, given that I remember its former glories. I'm sorry, too, that the historic purpose-built Household of Faith Sunday School, the first in Plymouth, was torn down. I just don't know what to think about the church remaining as it is a memorial to the Blitz victims". Miss Leigh was clear about what she felt for the church itself having attended from birth in 1903 "To me the church was particularly wonderful because there I got to know God… When it was blitzed in 1941 it was one of the few things that made me cry. My life seemed to be completely broken on that day."

During the mid-1990s there was a campaign to partially restore the church to incorporate some modern glazed roofing to enclose a blitz museum.

== Markings and inscriptions ==
Following the destruction of the church, a Mr G. W. Copeland visited it and recorded many of the historical monumental inscriptions and other ecclesiastical inscriptions. He presented his findings to the Devonshire Association in 1949. Much of what follows is his work:

Within a few weeks of the great raid that destroyed the building, the writer, in company with Mr Cyril Palmer, had the opportunity of paying more than one visit to the ruins, for the purpose of making photographic and other records. As may be expected, every scrap of woodwork, old and new, had been consumed; even the tower had been burned out; and the only part to escape destruction was the modern vestry on the north side of the chancel. All the bells, with one exception, and that was cracked, were broken; and not one mural monument escaped damage. The font was smashed to small fragments, which were collected later to form a small cairn.

The west tower of Charles Church, like St Andrew's, is built of limestone and granite. It is of three stages, divided by moulded strings and at each angle are double buttresses. The spire is octagonal and is surmounted by a ball and vane. The tower bears two date stones; 1657 on the north side and 1708 on the south side.

The East Window of the church was very elaborate and was of a remarkable design for a church built in the 17th century. There was originally a doorway underneath the east window, this had been walled up in 1665: its location became apparent by the damage caused in the blitz.

The following transcriptions come from the work of Mr Copeland, shortly after the blitz on Plymouth:

=== On the bells ===
A framed card which hung in the vestry recorded the following:

Bell	Inscription	Weight
Tenor	C & G Mears of London Founders 1856. Revd Henry Addington Greaves, Vicar. John Edwards Blewett, William Davey, Churchwardens	23cwt, 3qrs, 12 lb (5.4 kg)
7th	Similar inscription	15cwt, 2qrs, 27 lb (12 kg)
6th	C Mears of London fecit	approx 12cwt, 2qrs, 27 lb (12 kg)
5th	Wm Chapman of London fecit 1782	11cwt, 2qrs, 27 lb (12 kg)
4th	In wedlocks bands to join with hands your hearts unite, so shall our tuneful tongues combine to laud the nuptial rite	9cwt
3rd	Such wondrous power to music given. It elevates the soul to heaven	8cwt
2nd	If you have a judicious ear you'll own my voice is sweet and clear	7cwt
Treble	Same as the Tenor	6cwt, 1qrs, 23 lb (10 kg)

When the bells lay broken or cracked after falling through the tower the following inscriptions were recorded:

Bell	Inscription
Tenor	RECAST BY GILLETT & JOHNSTONE, CROYDON, 1936. CHAPMAN OF LONDON FECIT LONDON 1856 (the remainder indecipherable) GREAVES VICAR CHURCHWARDENS C & G MEARS FOUNDERS LONDON 1856 REVD HY ADDINGTON GREAVES VICAR (with band or ornament) JNO EDWARDS BLEWETT, WM DAVEY – CHURCHWARDENS
5th	WM CHAPMAN OF LONDON FECIT 1782
A broken fragment	IF YOUTH ELEVATES THE SOUL __OWN MY VOICE SWEET AND CLEAR (with band of ornament)

=== On other monuments ===
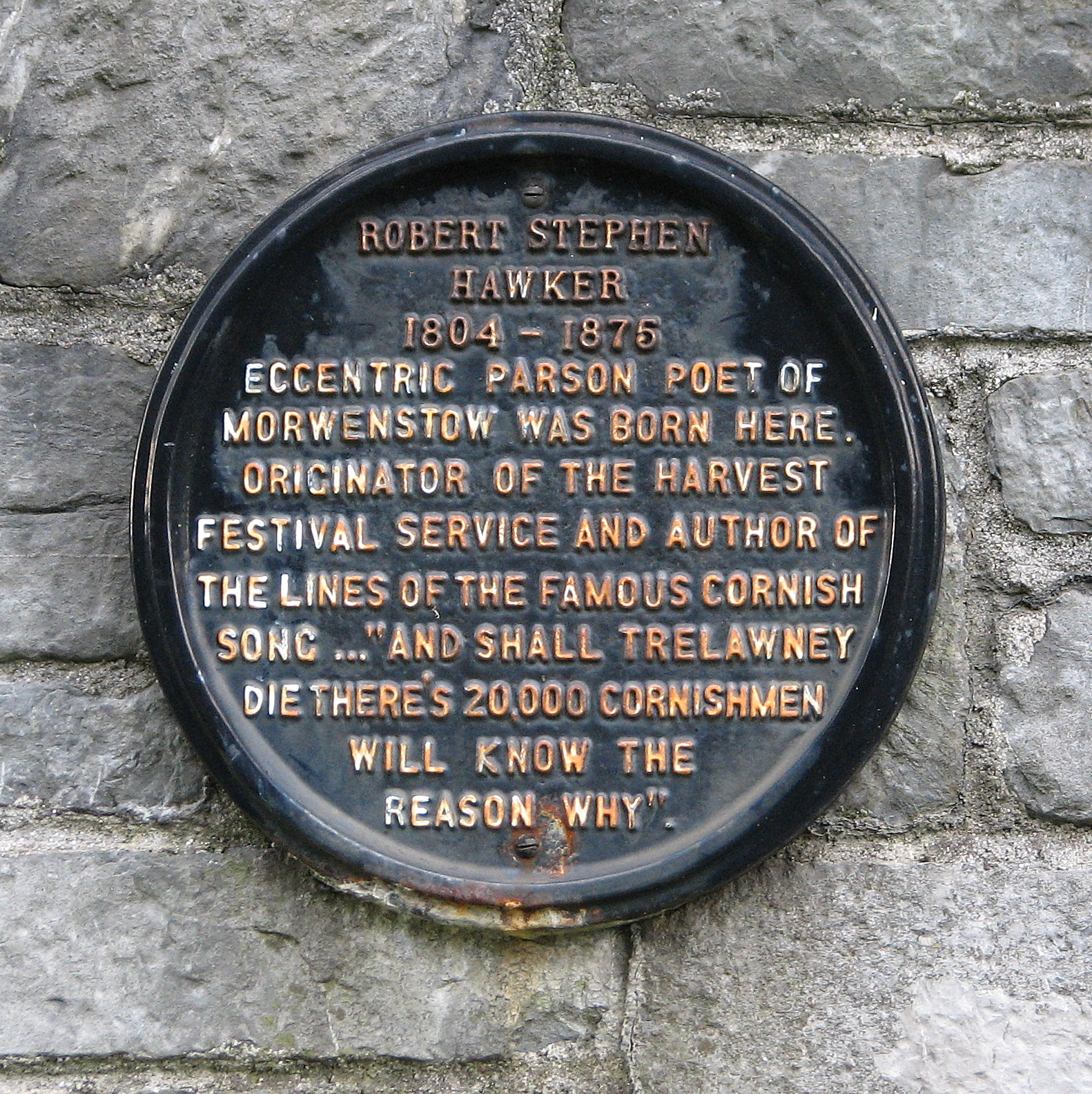
Plaque on the wall of the ruined church to Robert Stephen Hawker, who was born in the vicarage of this church and raised by his grandfather Robert Hawker

Many monuments in the ruins of Charles Church were destroyed beyond identification. The following are those that remained.

- A brass rectangular tablet recording the erection in the north aisle of a window in memory of Admiral Blake, though badly bent, stained and partly fused, bore the following decipherable inscription:

To the Glory of God and in Affectionate Remembrance of Admiral Robert Blake who first established the Naval Supremacy of Great Britain which has ever since been maintained. This window is placed by several English and American Family descendants for the purpose of recording his daring bravery, his splendid achievements and his pure noble blameless character, August 1889. The Memory of the Just is Blessed. Prov. 0. 7.

In the north aisle:

- Marble memorial, inscribed:

To the Memory of Mr William Rowe of this towne, Merchant, a great benefactor the poor, who died ye 27 day of December 1690. Also Frances his wife, who died the 18 of December 1688.

- Black and white marble tablet, inscribed:

To the Memory of John Nicolls Esq, who died the 16th of May 1790 aged 59 years and of Elizabeth Nicolls his widow who died the 12th day of June 1794 aged 60 years.

The epitaph reads:

When sorrow weeps o'er virtue's sacred dust, Our tears become us and our grief is just. Such were the tears she shed who grateful pays, This last sad tribute of her love and praise, Who mourns the best of friends and parents kind, Where female softness met a manly mind. Mourns but not murmurs, sighs but not despairs, Feels as a mortal - as a Christian bears.

- Small black and white marble tablet, inscribed:

To the Memory of Francis Hawker, Daughter of John and Mary Frances Hawker, who died the 16th of May 1818: Aged 24 years

- Small rectangular black and white marble tablet, inscribed:

To the Memory of Mary Frances Winne, Daughter of Sir Edmund Keynton Williams and Catherine his Wife. Nov. 29 1820.

A lower tablet records:

Also her sisters, Caroline Winne, who died Feb 20th 1822 aged 5 months. Caroline Gwyneth Williams died May 10, 1828 aged 9 months. Maud Lewellyn Seys Williams died May 11, 1828 aged 2 years.

- Rectangular black and white marble tablet, inscribed:

To the Memory of James Hawker Esq, A Post-Captain in His Majesty's Navy who died the 23rd March 1786 aged 58 years. And of Dorothea Hawker, his widow who died the 25th January 1816 ag[e]d 78 years.

- Monument of black marble, inscription in Latin (translated):

To Moses George Vincent de Batens in Northill, died August 23, 1663 and Matthias, his Brother, died Feb 11, 1683.

- White marble tablet, inscribed:

Here lie the bodies of Samuel Brent Esqr and Henrietta his Wife. Samuel died December 26, 1788 aged 77, Henrietta died February 21, 1784 aged 63. Gratefull affection for the best of Parents has caused this Monument to be erected to their Memory.

- Damaged black and white marble tablet, inscribed:

To Vice-Admiral Richard Arthur, Companion of the Most Honourable Order of the Bath, Second Son of the Late John Arthur Esq of Plymouth. Died Oct. 26, 1854, aged 75. Also Elizabeth Fortescue, his Wife, and the Eldest Daughter of the Late Rev William Wells, Rector of East Allington, Devon. Died Aug. 16, 1853, aged 69. Also Catherine Elizabeth Caroline Henn Gennys, Daughter of the Above, and Wife of Commander J.N. Gennys, R.N. Died Apr. 30, 1861, aged 39. Also Richard William Arthur, Eldest Son, who died on board H.M.S. Iris off the Island of Mauritius, July 20 [no year], aged 19. The monument erected by Edward Fortescue and Oswald Cornish Arthur as a Tribute of Affection to their Beloved Parents, Sister and Brother.

In the west tower - north side:

- Rectangular stone tablet, inscribed:

William Spark of Fryery in Plymouth Esqr, died the 8th day of June in the year 1714. Being the last of his Name and Family in that place. Resurgam.

- An upright rectangular stone tablet, inscribed:

Mrs Anna Harris Rains, Wife of Capt. Stephen Rains of the Royal Navy. Died October 26, 1793 aged 61. Also Captain Rains. Died January 26, 1795. His remains are in the same vault as those of his wife.

In the south aisle:

- White marble tablet, inscribed:

Andrew Tracey Esq. of Gascoyne Place, Master in the Royal Navy for nearly half a century. Died March 9, 1826, aged 81. Also Sarah Tracey, Relict of the above, Died June 9, 1838, aged 79.

- Upright rectangular tablet, inscribed:

Elizabeth, Wife of Sir I. H. Seymour, Bart, Rector of Northchurch, Herts., Eldest Daughter of Robert Culme of Tothill, Rector of North Lewe and Parochial Curate of Plympton St Mary. Died March 6, 1841. Blessed are the pure in Heart for they shall see God. This tablet is erected by her husband.

== Bibliography ==
- Pevsner, Nikolaus (1952) South Devon. Penguin Books; pp. 231–32
- Fleming, Guy (1987) Plymouth in War & Peace. St Teath: Bossiney Books; p. 40
