= Thurdon =

Hamlet in Cornwall, England

Coordinates: 50°52′24″N 4°26′15″W

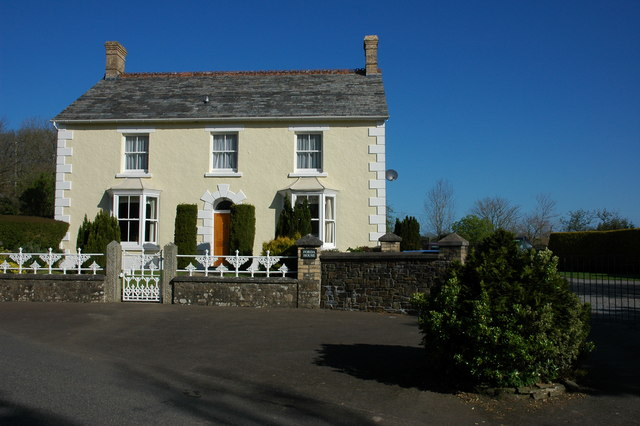
Forda House near Thurdon

Thurdon is a hamlet in the parish of Kilkhampton, Cornwall, England, United Kingdom.
