= Woodford, Cornwall =

Coordinates: 50.88°N 4.54°W

Woodford
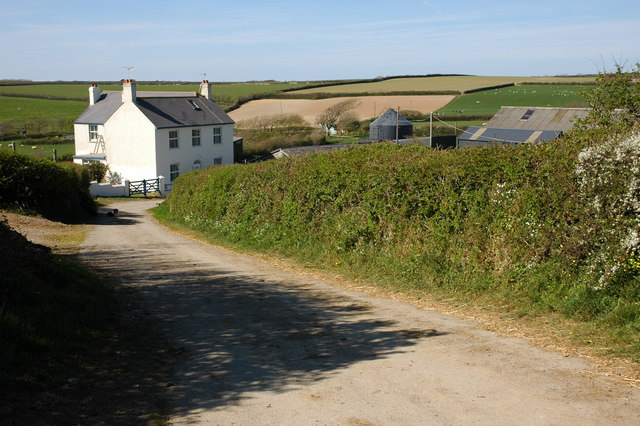
- Shears Farm, Woodford

- Location within Cornwall
- Unitary authority: Cornwall
- Ceremonial county: Cornwall
- Region: South West
- Country: England
- Sovereign state: United Kingdom
- Postcode district: EX23
- Police: Devon and Cornwall
- Fire: Cornwall
- Ambulance: South Western

Woodford is a hamlet in northeast Cornwall, England, United Kingdom. It is located southeast of Morwenstow, northwest of Kilkhampton and north of Flexbury. It contains the Woodford Methodist Church.

Woodford lies within the Cornwall Area of Outstanding Natural Beauty (AONB).
