= Shop, Cornwall =

Hamlet in Cornwall, England

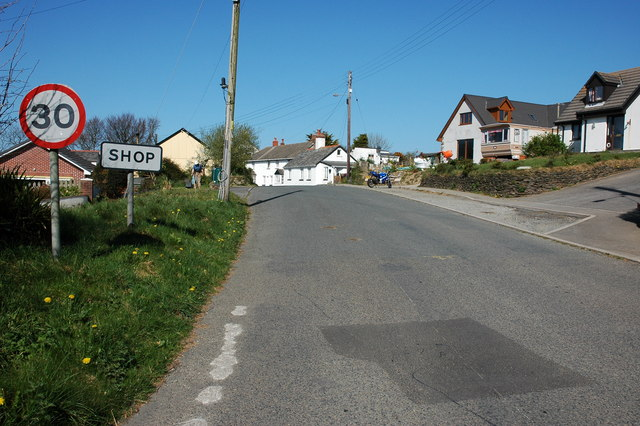
Shop, Cornwall

Shop is a hamlet in Morwenstow civil parish, north of Bude in Cornwall, United Kingdom. OS grid reference is SS2214.

Shop lies within the Cornwall National Landscape (AONB).
