= Stibb =

Hamlet in Cornwall, England

Coordinates: 50°52′11″N 4°31′22″W

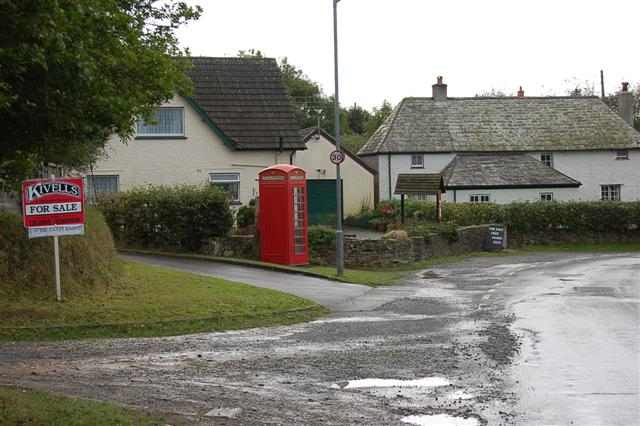
Stibb

Stibb (Cornish: Stok) is a hamlet near Bude in Cornwall, England, United Kingdom.

Stibb lies within the Cornwall Area of Outstanding Natural Beauty (AONB).
