= Hawker's Hut =

Grade II listed building near Morwenstow, Cornwall, United Kingdom

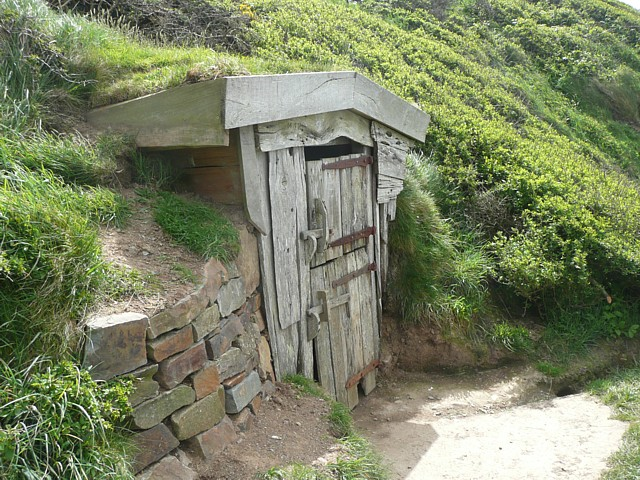
- The hut where Hawker spent many hours writing poems and smoking opium

- Location within Cornwall
- 50.9074°N 4.5629°W
- Location: Morwenstow, Cornwall, England

Listed Building – Grade II
- Official name: Hawker's Hut
- Designated: 9 September 1985
- Reference no.: 1328568

Hawker's Hut is an historic hut at Morwenstow, Cornwall originally built by the eccentric clergyman, poet and antiquarian, Robert Stephen Hawker (1803 – 1875), close to Higher Sharpnose Point. The hut is located approximately 1 mile from Morwenstow Church.

The hut is mainly of timber construction and is partially built into the hillside (earth sheltered) with a turf roof. It was originally built from driftwood and timber retrieved from shipwrecks by the eccentric vicar and poet. Parson Hawker spent many hours in the hut writing poems and smoking opium, perhaps inspired by the views of the Atlantic Ocean. Visitors to the hut during Hawker's time there included Alfred Tennyson in 1848 (with whom Hawker toured Tintagel) and Charles Kingsley. Today the hut is accessible on foot from the coastal footpath via a short set of steps.

Hawker's hut has been maintained since its original construction although some of the original elements are still present. It is currently the smallest property belonging to the National Trust.

== Gallery ==
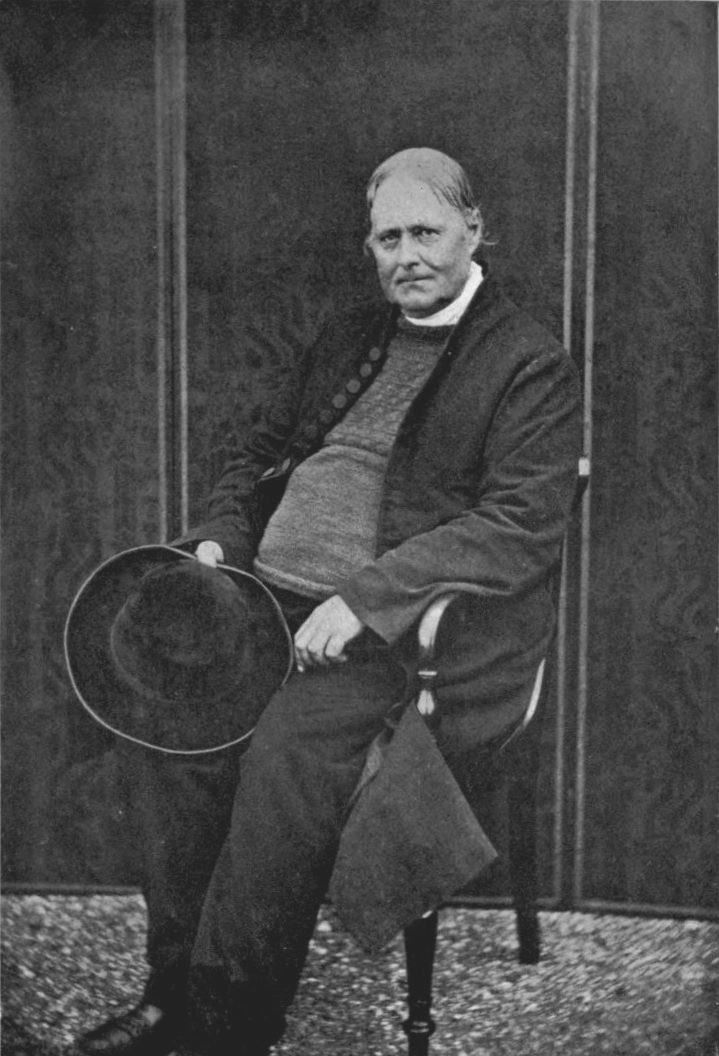
Robert Stephen Hawker (1864)

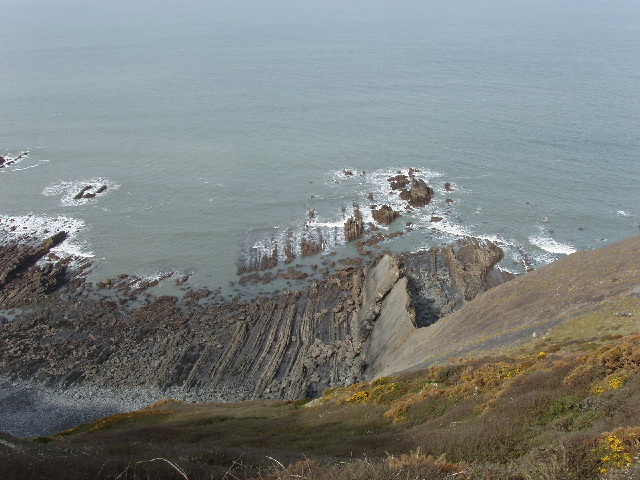
West-nor-west view from Hawker's Hut straight down the cliff

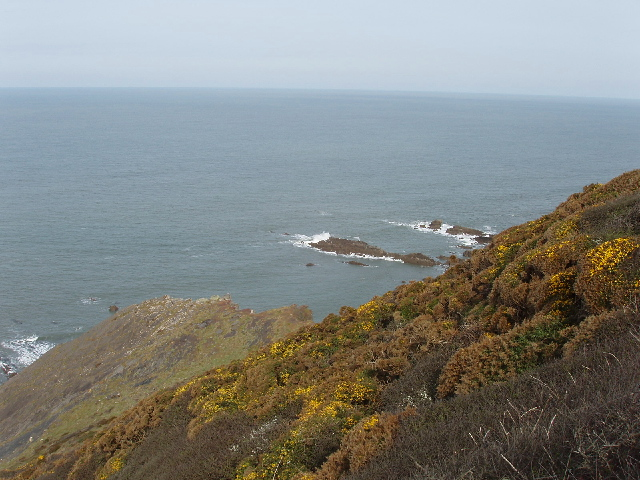
Nor-west view with gorse

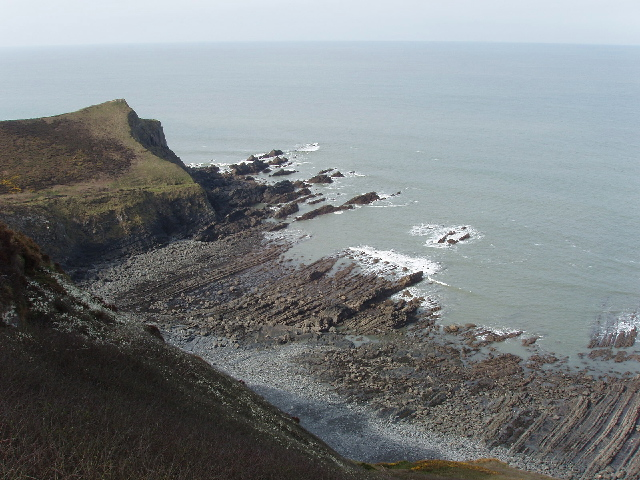
West-south-west view down to a wave-cut platform and a small headland

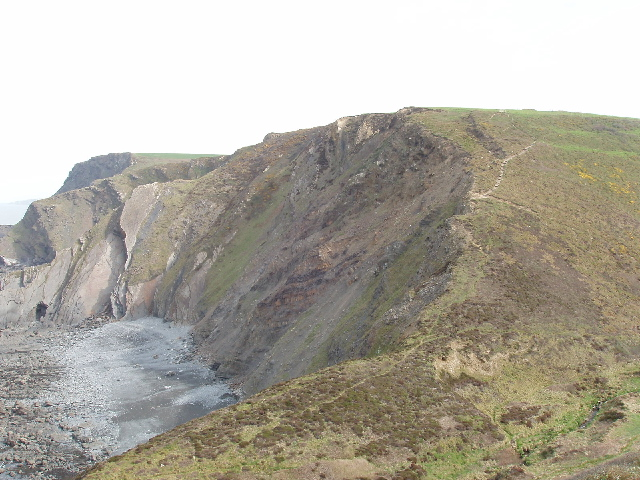
The hut is at the top of this cliff, but is not visible in this photo

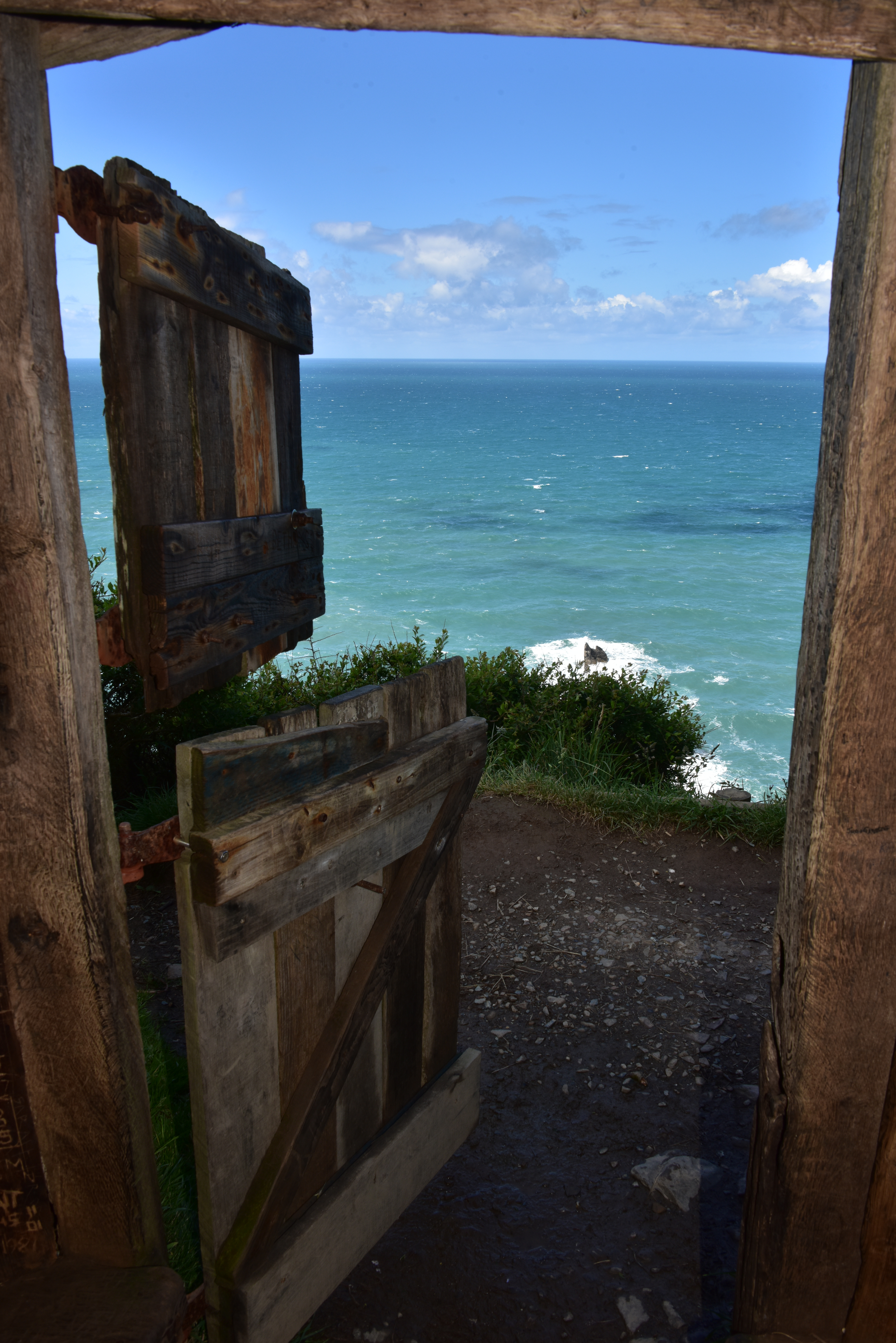
View from inside Hawker's Hut
