= West Youlstone =

Coordinates: 50.9°N 4.47°W

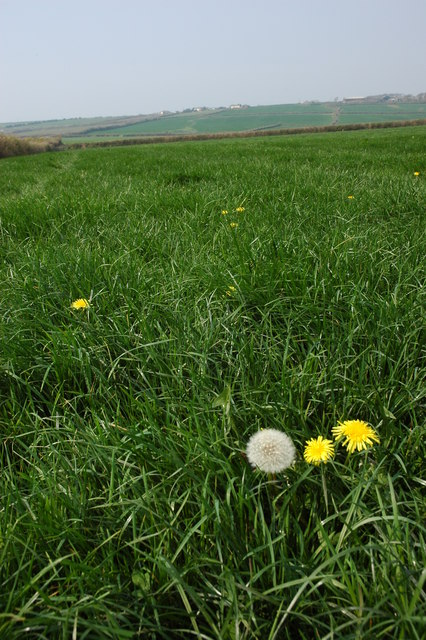

- Location within Cornwall
- Unitary authority: Cornwall
- Ceremonial county: Cornwall
- Region: South West
- Country: England
- Sovereign state: United Kingdom
- Postcode district: EX23
- Police: Devon and Cornwall
- Fire: Cornwall
- Ambulance: South Western

West Youlstone is a hamlet in north Cornwall, England, United Kingdom. It lies seven miles north north west of Bude and north of Kilkhampton along the A39 road. It belongs to the parish of Morwenstow, and lies to the east of it. East Youlstone is immediately to the east but is in Devon.

== History ==
Archaeological discoveries on the site have revealed it was occupied in the Bronze Age. It is mentioned in the memoirs of James Thorne of Shebbear.
