= Gooseham =

Hamlet in Cornwall, England

Coordinates: 50.919°N 4.519°W

Gooseham: Cornish: Pras an Woodh
- Hamlet
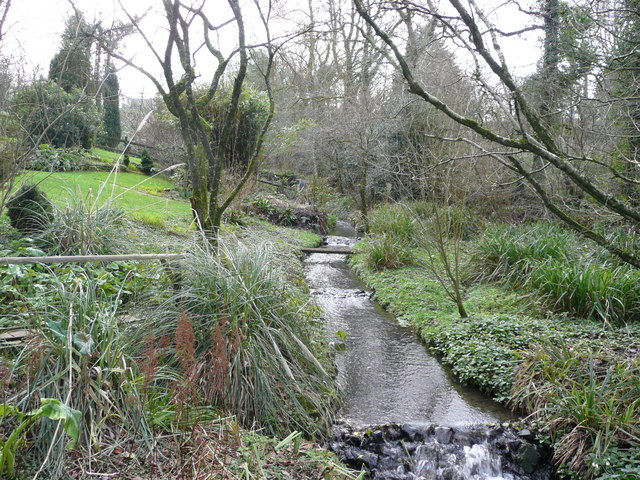
- A stream and garden at Gooseham

- Location within Cornwall
- Unitary authority: Cornwall
- Region: South West
- Country: England
- Sovereign state: United Kingdom
- Police: Devon and Cornwall
- Fire: Cornwall
- Ambulance: South Western

Gooseham (Cornish: Pras an Woodh, meaning meadow of the goose) is a hamlet in northeast Cornwall, England, United Kingdom. It is situated six miles (11 km) north of Bude and is approximately one kilometre south of the border with Devon. The Marsland Valley nature reserve is near the hamlet. It is in the civil parish of Morwenstow, and its size been described by a resident as consisting of just "two houses and a wood rick."

Gooseham lies within the Cornwall Area of Outstanding Natural Beauty (AONB).
