= Robert Hawker (poet) =

British Anglican priest, poet, antiquarian and reputed eccentric

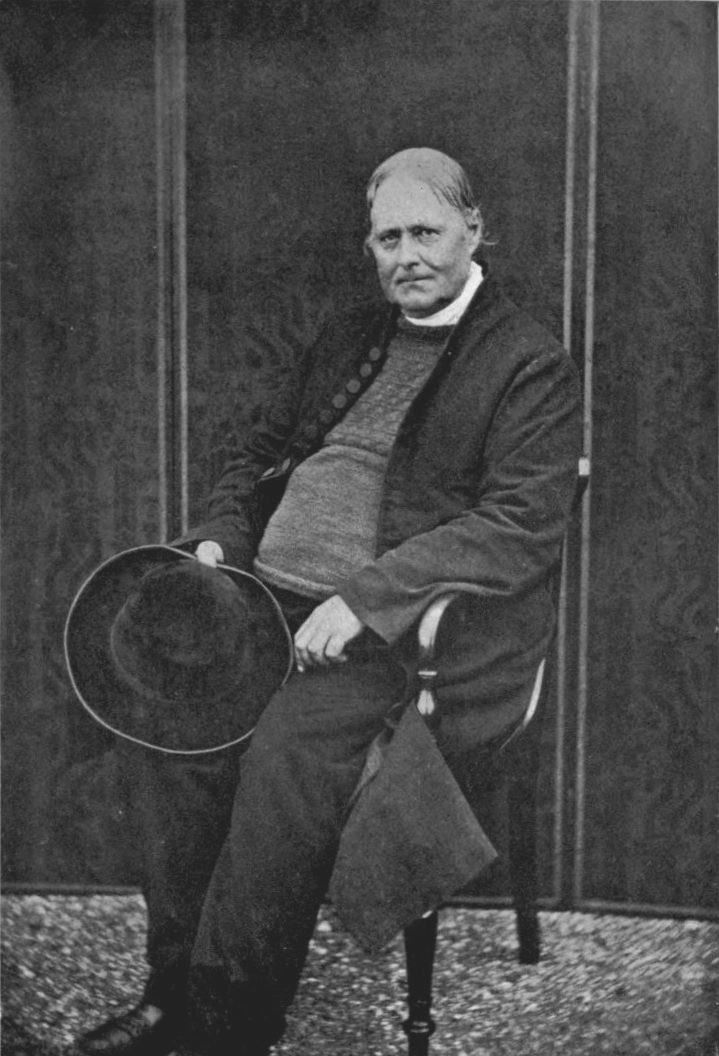
Robert Stephen Hawker (1864)

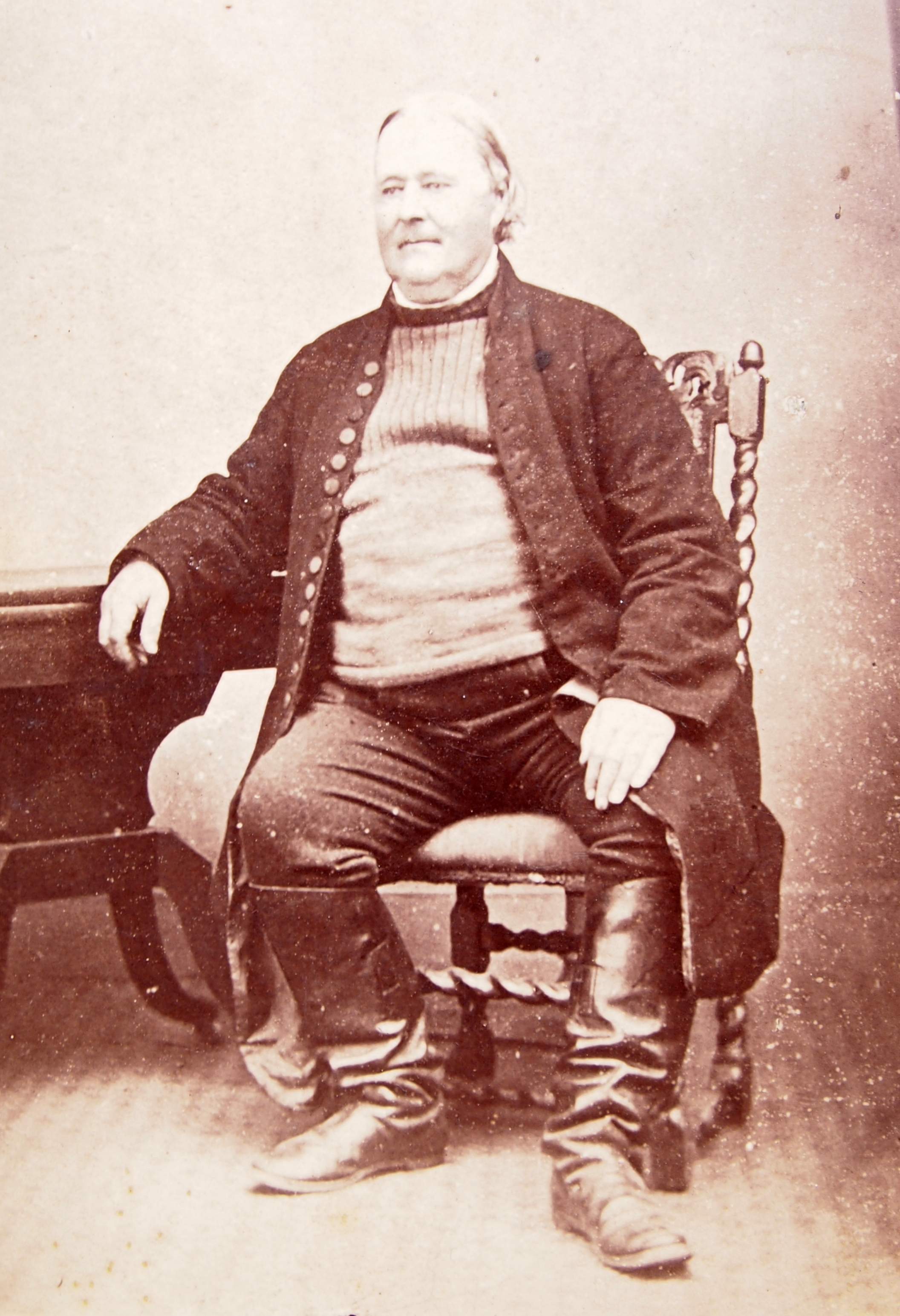
Robert Stephen Hawker 1869

Robert Stephen Hawker (1803–1875) was a British Anglican priest, poet, antiquarian and reputed eccentric, known to his parishioners as Parson Hawker. He is best known as the writer of "The Song of the Western Men" with its chorus line of "And shall Trelawny die? / Here's twenty thousand Cornish men / will know the reason why!", which he published anonymously in 1825. His name became known after Charles Dickens acknowledged his authorship of "The Song of the Western Men" in the serial magazine Household Words.

== Biography ==
Hawker was born in the clergy house of Charles Church, Plymouth, on 3 December 1803. He was the eldest male of nine children and grandson of Robert Hawker, vicar of Charles Church. When he was about ten years old his father, Jacob Stephen Hawker, took Holy Orders and left Plymouth to become curate of Altarnun, leaving him in the care of his grandparents. By this time Hawker was already reading and writing poetry. He was educated at Liskeard Grammar School and Cheltenham Grammar School (now Pate's Grammar School). As an undergraduate, aged 19, he married Charlotte Eliza I'ans, aged 41. The couple spent their honeymoon at Tintagel in 1823, a place that kindled his lifelong fascination with Arthurian legend and later inspired him to write The Quest of the Sangraal. This marriage, along with a legacy, helped to finance his studies at Pembroke College, Oxford. He graduated in 1827 and won the 1827 Newdigate Prize for poetry.

Hawker was ordained in 1831, becoming curate at North Tamerton and then, in 1834, vicar of the church at Morwenstow, where he remained throughout his life. When he arrived at Morwenstow there had not been a vicar in residence for over a century. Smugglers and wreckers were apparently numerous in the area. A contemporary report says the Morwenstow wreckers "allowed a fainting brother to perish in the sea ... without extending a hand of safety."

Hawker's first wife, Charlotte, died in 1863 and the following year, aged 60, he married Pauline Kuczynski, aged 20. They had three daughters, Morwenna Pauline Hawker, Rosalind Hawker and Juliot Hawker. Robert Hawker died on 15 August 1875, having become a Roman Catholic on his deathbed. He was buried in Plymouth's Ford Park Cemetery. His funeral was noteworthy because the mourners wore purple instead of the traditional black.

== Accomplishments ==
=== Shipwrecks ===
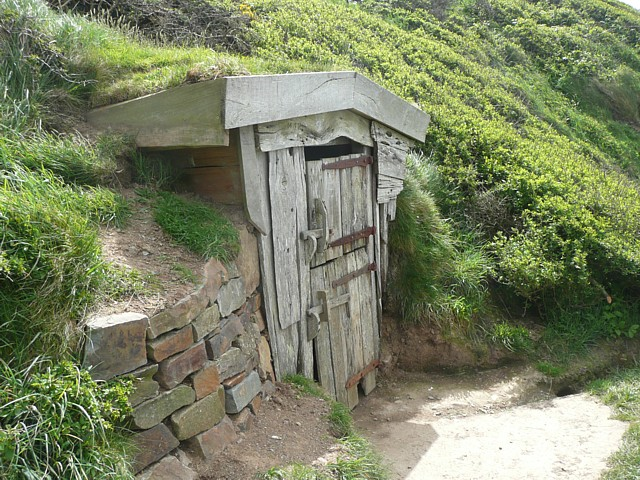
Hawker's Hut

Hawker was regarded as a deeply compassionate person giving Christian burials to shipwrecked seamen washed up on the shores of the parish, and was often the first to reach the cliffs when there was a shipwreck. Formerly, the bodies of shipwrecked sailors were often either buried on the beach where they were found or left in the sea. The figurehead of the ship Caledonia, which foundered in September 1842, marks the grave in Morwenstow churchyard of five of the nine-man crew. Hawker described the wrecking in his book Footprints of Former Men in Far Cornwall. Nearby stands a granite cross marked with words of the Apostles Paul, "Unknown Yet Well Known", close to the graves of 30 or more seafarers, including the captain of the Alonzo, wrecked in 1843.

Another notable rescue effort was occasioned by the Martha Quayle of Liverpool on 4 December 1863. This vessel was seen dismasted off Hennacliff with the crew making the best of their situation; two boats were lowered from the side of which one was driven northward by the heavy seas while the other came ashore unmanned. The first boat was seen by Hawker being rowed by five men but did not make a landing until Clovelly. An attempt to launch the Bude lifeboat or bring her along the land failed but by riding along the coast as far as Clovelly Hawker found the mate and four crewmen safe. He failed to persuade the men of Clovelly to launch a skiff but a customs officer from Bideford happened to be there and was able to send a message to the Appledore lifeboatmen to assist if they could. The Martha Quayle was unlighted by Saturday nightfall. On the Sunday he sent a man towards Clovelly and sometime later that man brought thanks for their deliverance from the captain and crew back to Hawker. A rowing boat crewed by 19 men went north and jointly with the Appledore lifeboatmen who had brought their boat by land got the Martha Quayle on shore ready to be sold by auction the next day.

=== Ritual innovation, eccentricity; hut and vicarage ===
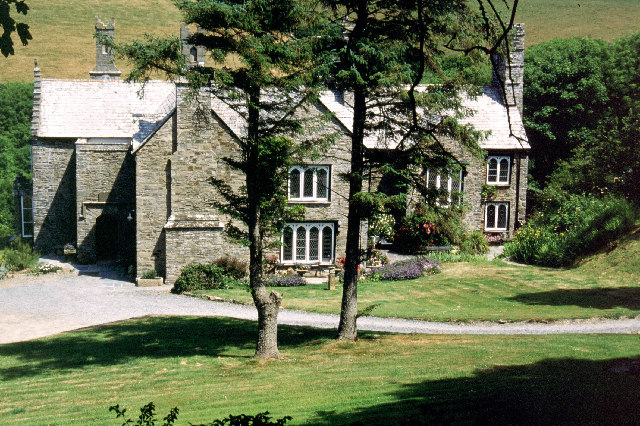
Morwenstow Vicarage

The Harvest Festival that we know today was introduced in the parish of Morwenstow in 1843 by Hawker. He invited his parishioners to a Harvest service as he wanted to give thanks to God for providing such plenty. This service took place on 1 October and bread made from the first cut of corn was taken at communion.

"Parson Hawker", as he was known to his parishioners, was something of an eccentric, both in his clothes and his habits. He loved bright colours and it seems the only black things he wore were his socks. He built a small hut, that became known as Hawker's Hut, from driftwood on the cliffs overlooking the Atlantic Ocean. He spent many hours there writing his poems and letters. This driftwood hut is now the smallest property in the National Trust portfolio. Many of the more fantastic stories told about Hawker are based on an unreliable biography published by the Reverend Sabine Baring-Gould in 1876, only a few months after Hawker's death. Other eccentricities attributed to him include dressing up as a mermaid and excommunicating his cat for mousing on Sundays. He dressed in a claret-coloured coat, blue fisherman's jersey, long sea boots, a pink brimless hat and a poncho made from a yellow horse blanket, which he claimed was the ancient habit of St Padarn. He talked to birds, invited his nine cats into the church and kept a pig as a pet.

He built himself a remarkable vicarage, with chimneys modelled on the towers of the churches in his life: Tamerton, where he had been curate; Morwenstow and Welcombe; plus that of Magdalen College, Oxford. The old kitchen chimney is a replica of Hawker's mother's tomb.

Of his interesting life, Hawker himself wrote: "What a life mine would be if it were all written and published in a book."

The American poet Joyce Kilmer described him as "a coast life-guard in a cassock" and was to some extent influenced by Hawker's poetry.

== Works ==
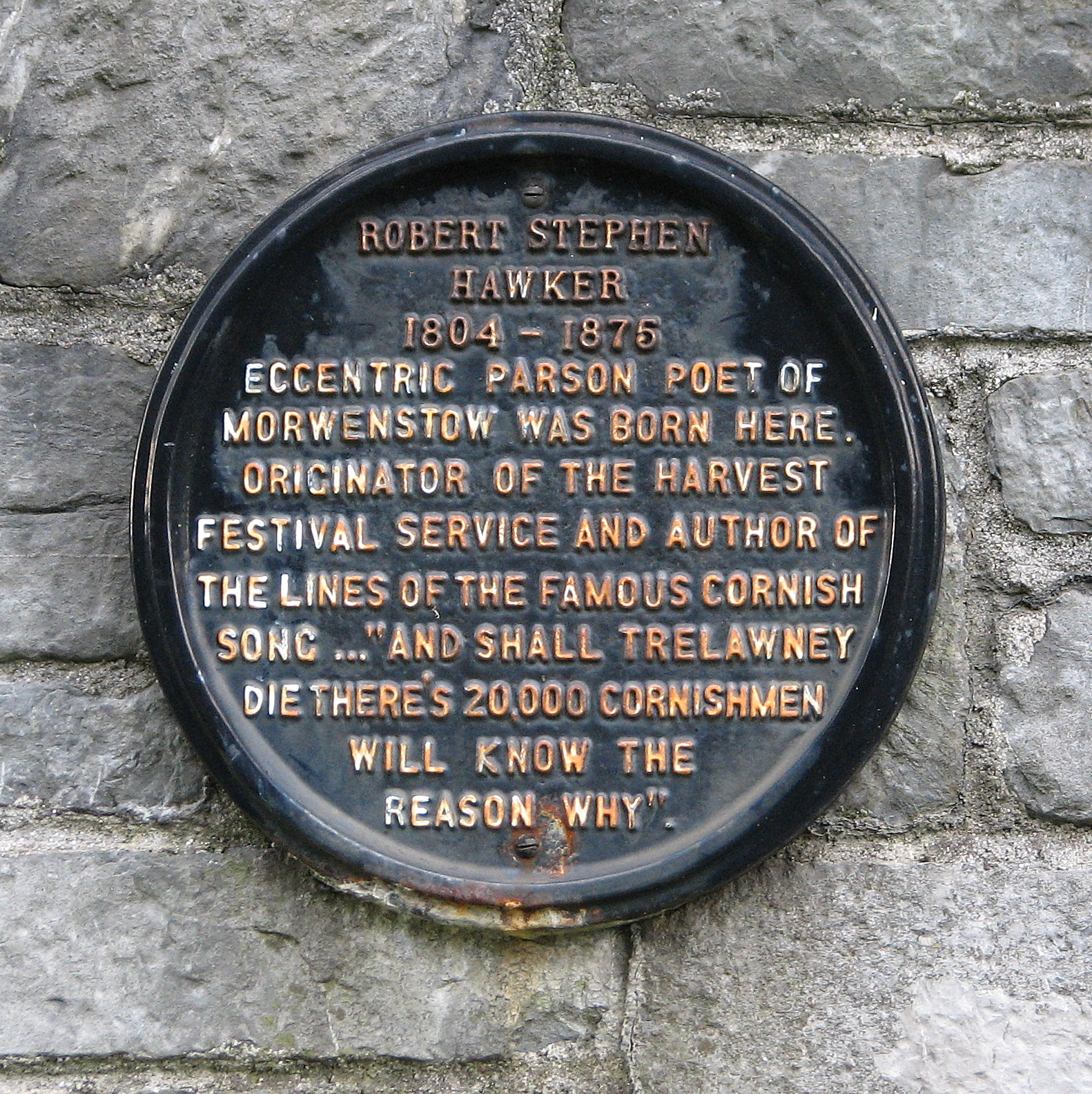
Plaque to Hawker in the ruined Charles Church, Plymouth—he was born in the vicarage of Charles parish

- 1821: Tendrils
- 1832: Records of the Western Shore Oxford
- 1840: Ecclesia: a volume of poems Oxford
- 1843: Reeds Shaken with the Wind
- 1846: Echoes from Old Cornwall
- 1864: The Quest of the Sangraal: Chant the First, Exeter; (part of an unfinished Arthurian poem)
- 1869: The Cornish Ballads and Other Poems, (new ed., with an introduction by C. E. Byles, 1908)
- 1870: Footprints of Former Men in Cornwall (a collection of papers)
- 1975: Selected Poems: Robert Stephen Hawker. Ed. Cecil Woolf

== Bibliography ==
- The Poetical Works of Robert Stephen Hawker (1879); now first collected and arranged by J. G. Godwin; [includes Notice, pp. vii–xviii]. London: C. Kegan Paul
- The Life and Letters of R. S. Hawker (sometime Vicar of Morwenstow) (1906) by C. E. Byles. London: Bodley Head
- "Passon" Hawker of Morwenstow ([1959]); H. R. Smallcombe. Plymouth: [the author]
- The Wreck at Sharpnose Point (2003) by Jeremy Seal, Picador. ISBN 0-330-37465-6
- Hawker of Morwenstow (2002) by Piers Brendon, Random House. ISBN 0-224-01122-7
- The Land Near the Dark Cornish Sea (2004) by A. Hale, Journal for the Academic Study of Magic, Issue 2, Pages 206–225
- ”Reverend Hawker of Morwenstow" by 3 Daft Monkeys. From the album "of stones and bones"
