= Morwenstow =

Civil parish in Cornwall, England

Morwenstow: Cornish: Logmorwenn
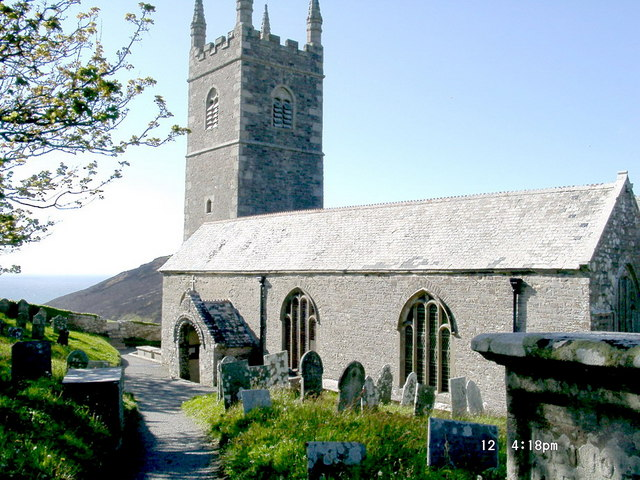

- Location within Cornwall
- Civil parish: Morwenstow
- Unitary authority: Cornwall
- Ceremonial county: Cornwall
- Region: South West
- Country: England
- Sovereign state: United Kingdom
- Police: Devon and Cornwall
- Fire: Cornwall
- Ambulance: South Western
- UK Parliament: North Cornwall

Morwenstow (Cornish: Logmorwenn, meaning Morwenn's monastic cell) is a civil parish in north Cornwall, England, United Kingdom. The parish abuts the west coast, about six miles (10 km) north of Bude and within the Cornwall Area of Outstanding Natural Beauty (AONB).

Morwenstow is the most northerly parish in Cornwall. As well as the churchtown (a hamlet called Crosstown), other settlements in the parish include Shop, Woodford, Gooseham, Eastcott, Woolley and West Youlstone. The population at the 2011 census was 791. Morwenstow parish is bounded to the north and east by parishes in Devon, to the south by Kilkhampton parish and to the west by the Atlantic. The River Tamar has its source at a spring on Woolley Moor, at 50.9235°N 4.4622°W, which is in the parish near the border with Devon.

Morwenstow is the one-time home of the eccentric vicar and poet Robert Stephen Hawker (1803–1875), the writer of Cornwall's anthem "Trelawny". Hawker is also credited with reviving the custom of Harvest Festivals.

== Parish church ==
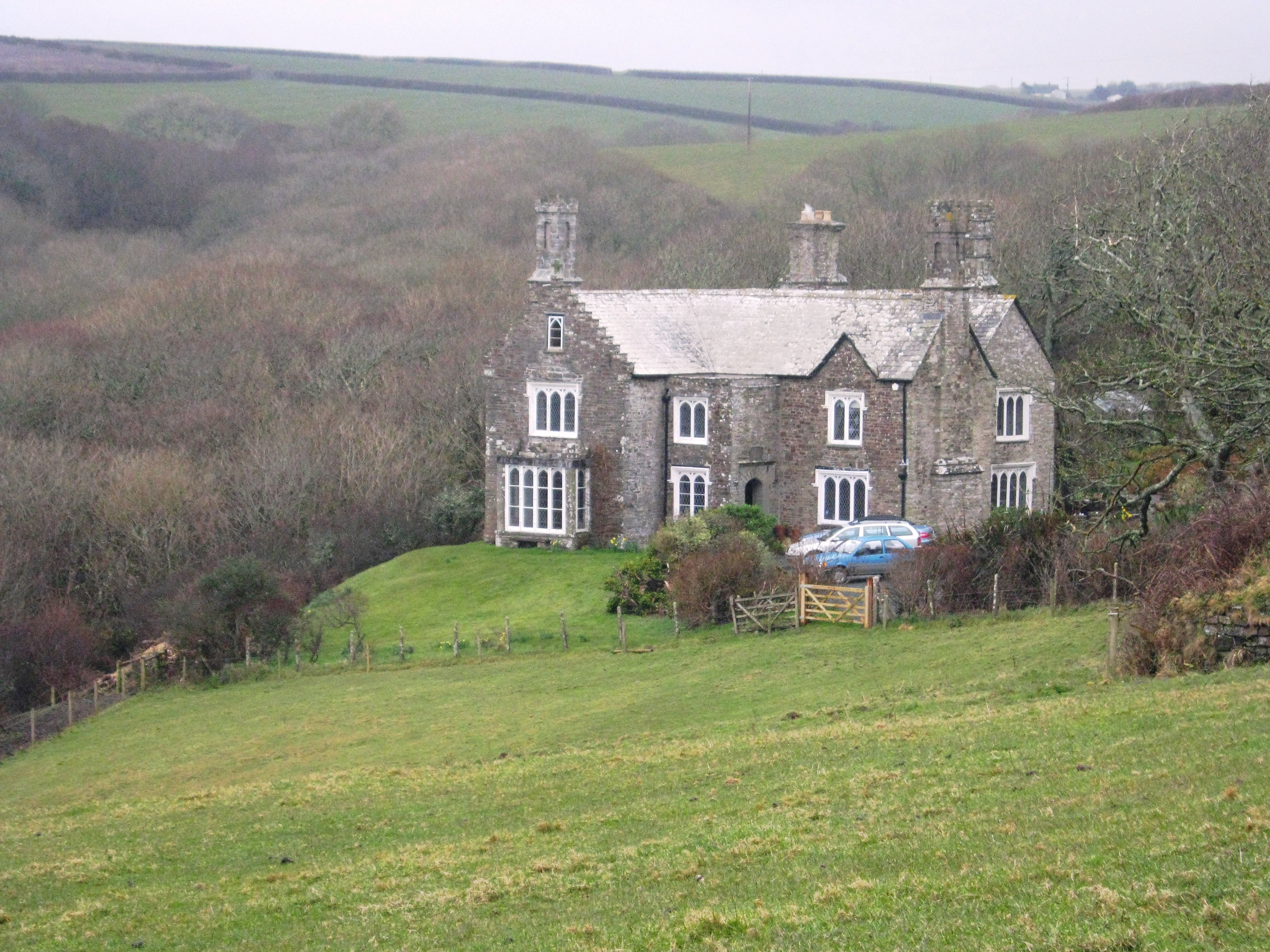
Morwenstow Vicarage

The Church of St Morwenna and St John the Baptist, Morwenstow is dedicated to Saints John the Baptist and Morwenna and is of the Norman period. The Vicarage was built for Hawker and has chimneys in the form of the towers of various churches associated with him.

The nearby coast is hazardous to shipping and the corpses of drowned sailors were laid out in the churchyard and then buried. Hawker buried over forty who were washed up within the parish boundaries.

One of the memorials in the churchyard was the white figurehead of the "Caledonia", a brig from Scotland that sank on the perilous rocks of Higher Sharpnose in 1842. The captain and most of the crew are buried in the churchyard. In 2004 the figurehead was removed for conservation and is now displayed on the north wall inside the church. A resin replica of the figurehead stands in the churchyard.

== History and description ==
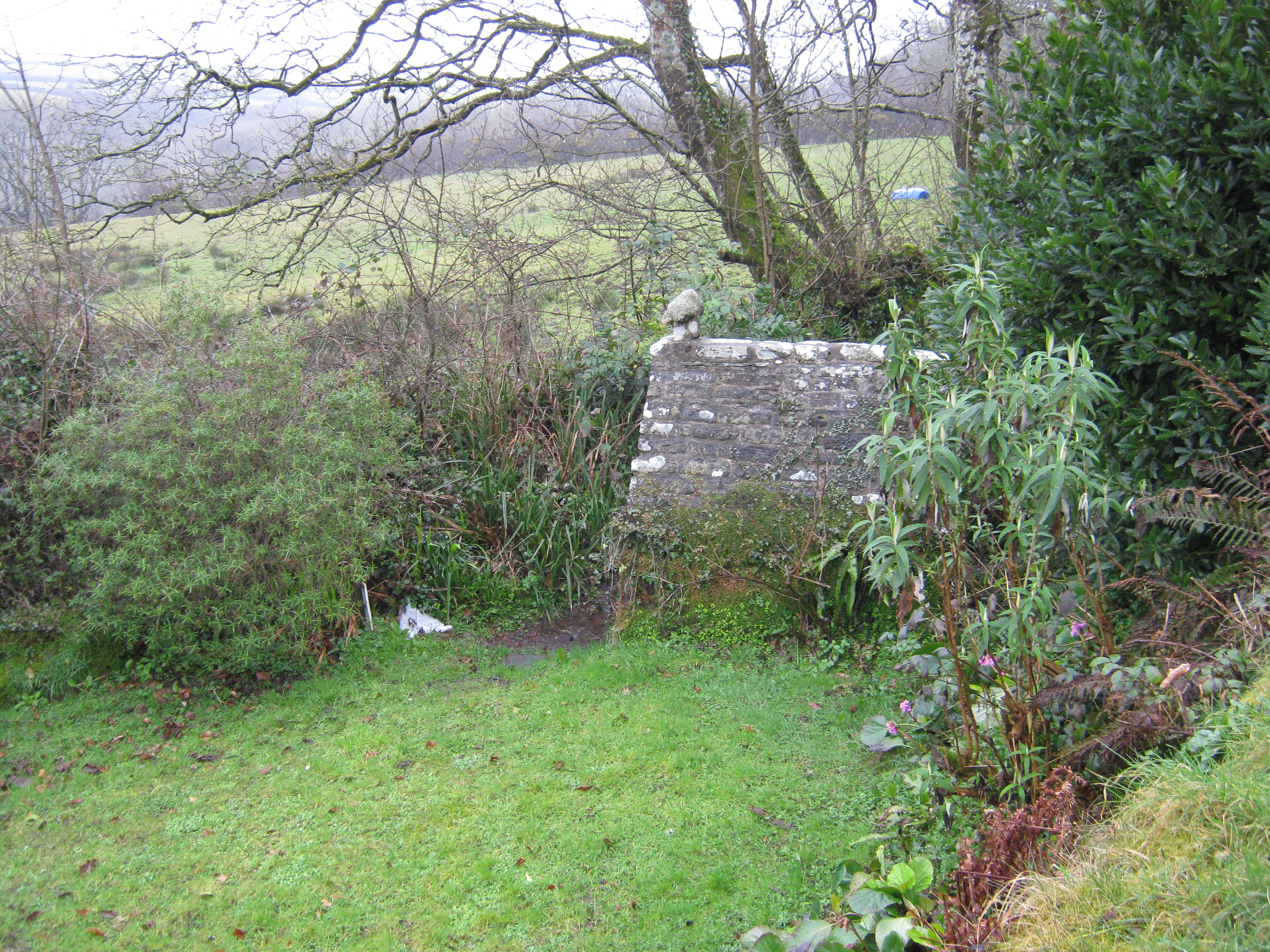
St John's holy well

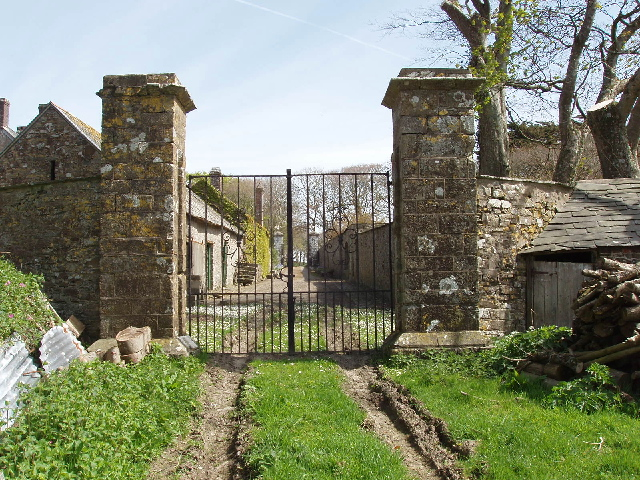
The gateway of Tonacombe manor

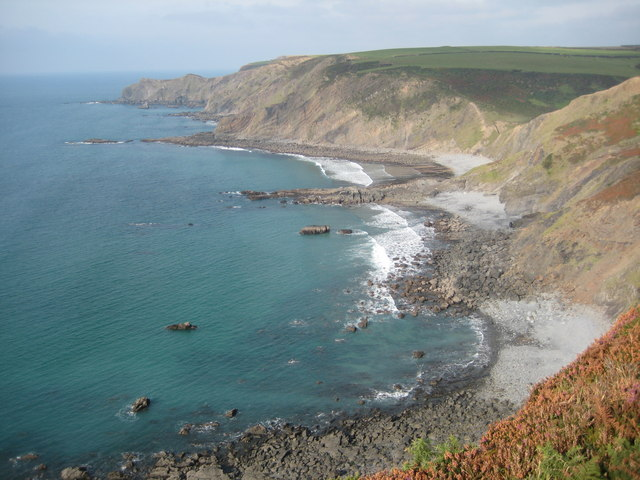
Stanbury Mouth

A path leads from the church and down to the cliff edge, where the National Trust's smallest building, "Hawker's Hut", is built into the face of the cliff overlooking the sea out towards the island of Lundy. Here, Hawker spent many hours in contemplation, writing poetry, and smoking his opium pipe. He also entertained guests here, including Alfred Tennyson and Charles Kingsley.

The holy well of St John on the glebe was mentioned in 1296. The so-called well of St Morwenna is on the cliff. There was a chapel of St Mary at Milton in 1407.

The manor of Stanbury in the parish is the birthplace of John Stanberry, Bishop of Hereford, who was made first Provost at Eton College by King Henry VI. Sir William Adams the oculist was also born at Stanbury. The manor house was built in the 16th century.

Nearby Tonacombe Manor has been described as the perfect Tudor manor. A round-headed Celtic cross was found here in the early 20th century; no round-headed cross was known north of Laneast before this one was found.

A striking example of curved and contorted stratified rocks occurs at Stanbury Creek. Dark cliffs of folded, interbedded shales and mudstones form wave-cut platforms.

GCHQ Bude, a satellite ground station stands on the cliffs of Cleave and its array of dishes is visible for miles around.

== Cornish wrestling ==
Cornish wrestling tournaments, for prizes, were held at an Inn that used to adjoin Morwenstow church.

== Literary associations ==
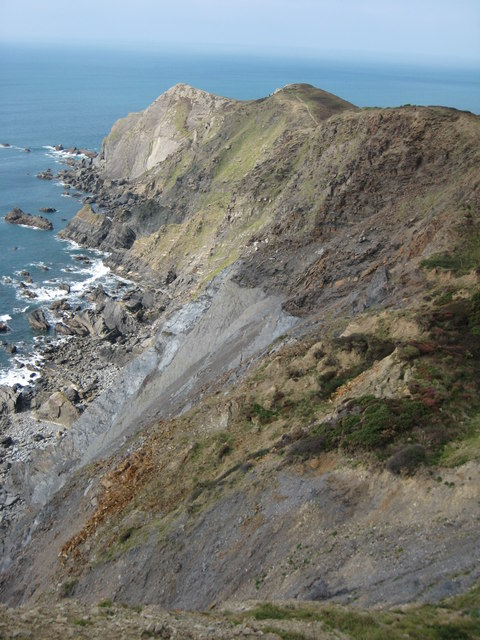
Higher Sharpnose Point

Morwenstow and its surroundings feature heavily in the plot of the mystery thriller novel Set in Stone (1999) by the British author Robert Goddard.

The Wreck at Sharpnose Point by Jeremy Seal (June 2003) is a novel based on the wrecking of the 'Caledonia' (first published in New York, 2001 ISBN 0-330-37465-6).

== Notable people ==
- Morwenna (8th C.) the eponymous patron saint of Morwenstow,
- John Stanberry (died 1474), Bishop of Hereford, who was made first Provost at Eton College by King Henry VI, born at Stanbury.
- Sir William Adams (1783–1827), the oculist was born at Stanbury
- Robert Stephen Hawker (1803–1875), poet and priest.
- Adelaide Phillpotts (1896–1993), novelist, poet and playwright is buried here
- Jonah Barrington (born 1941), international squash player and coach
- Michael Axworthy (1962–2019), diplomat, historian and commentator
- Sally Axworthy (born 1964), diplomat, widow of Michael Axworthy
