= Bude (electoral division) =

Electoral division of Cornwall in the UK

- ward Cornwall Council
- Boundary of Bude in Cornwall from 2021.
- County: Cornwall
- Major settlements: Bude, Flexbury (part)

Current ward
- Created: 2021
- Councillor: Peter La Broy (Independent)
- Number of councillors: One
- Created from: Bude

2013–2021
- Number of councillors: Two
- Replaced by: Bude
- Created from: Bude North and Stratton; Bude South

Bude (Cornish: Porthbud) is an electoral division of Cornwall in the United Kingdom.

From 2013 to 2021, it returned two members to sit on Cornwall Council, making it the only division to elect more than one Councillor. After boundary changes at the 2021 election, it now returns only one member. The current councillor is Peter La Broy, who was elected as a Liberal Democrat, but now sits as an Independent after leaving the Liberal Democrats in June 2021.

== Councillors ==
=== 2013-2021 ===
Election	First member	First member party	Second member	Second member party
2013	David Parsons	Liberal Democrat	Nigel Pearce	Liberal Democrat
2017	Peter La Broy	Liberal Democrat	Nigel Pearce	Liberal Democrat
2018 by-election (seat 1)	David Parsons	Liberal Democrat	Nigel Pearce	Liberal Democrat
2021	Seat abolished			

=== 2021–present ===
Election	Member	Party
May 2021	Peter La Broy	Liberal Democrat
June 2021	Peter La Broy	Independent

== Extent ==
2013-2021 division boundaries shown within Cornwall

=== 2013–2021 ===
The former division represented the town of Bude, the villages of Flexbury and Poughill, and the hamlets of Lynstone, Upton, and Crooklets. The hamlet of Bush was shared with the Grenville and Stratton division. It covered 1,139 hectares in total.

=== 2021–present ===
Bude division represents the town of Bude and the hamlets of Lynstone and Upton. The village of Flexbury is shared with the Stratton, Kilkhampton and Morwenstow division.

== Election results ==
=== 2021–present ===
==== 2021 election ====
2021 election: Bude
Party	Candidate	Votes	%	±%
Liberal Democrats	Peter La Broy	754	36.9	
Conservative	Richard Smith	543	26.6	
Independent	Tom O'Sullivan	517	25.3	
Green	Philippa Purchase	207	10.1	
Majority		211	10.3	
Rejected ballots		21	1.0	
Turnout		2042	43	
Liberal Democrats win (new seat)				

=== 2013–2021 ===
==== 2018 by-election ====
2018 by-election: Bude
Party	Candidate	Votes	%	±%
Liberal Democrats	David Parsons	1,010	53.1	
Independent	Bob Willingham	475	25.0	
Conservative	Alex Dart	264	13.9	
Labour	Ray Shemilt	148	7.8	
Majority		535	28.1	
Rejected ballots		4	0.2	
Turnout		1901	30.0	
Liberal Democrats hold		Swing		

==== 2017 election ====
2017 election: Bude
Party	Candidate	Votes	%	±%
Liberal Democrats	Nigel Pearce	1,395	28.6	
Liberal Democrats	Peter La Broy	1,272	26.1	
Conservative	Bob Willingham	1006	20.7	
Conservative	Lea Deely	938	19.3	
Labour	Fred Richens	248	5.1	
Majority		266	5.5	
Rejected ballots		11	0.2	
Turnout		4870	76.7	
Liberal Democrats hold		Swing		
Liberal Democrats hold		Swing		

==== 2013 election ====
2013 election: Bude
Party	Candidate	Votes	%	±%
Liberal Democrats	David Parsons	1,413	44.4	
Liberal Democrats	Nigel Pearce	1,281	40.3	
Conservative	Louise Emo	460	14.5	
Majority		821	25.8	
Rejected ballots		26	0.8	
Turnout		3180	50.8	
Liberal Democrats win (new seat)				
Liberal Democrats win (new seat)				
