= Bude–Stratton =

Civil parish in Cornwall, England

Coordinates: 50.827°N 4.523°W

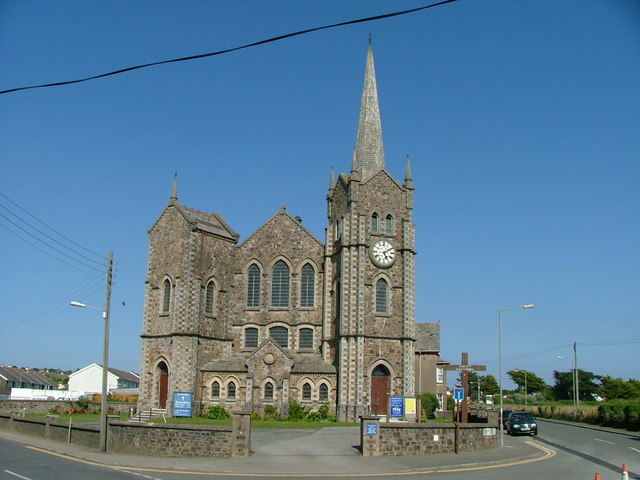
- Flexbury Park Methodist Church

- Location within Cornwall
- Population: 10,589 (2021 census)
- Civil parish: Bude–Stratton
- Unitary authority: Cornwall
- Shire county: Cornwall
- Region: South West
- Country: England
- Sovereign state: United Kingdom
- Police: Devon and Cornwall
- Fire: Cornwall
- Ambulance: South Western

Bude–Stratton (Cornish: Bud–Strasnedh) is a civil parish in Cornwall, England. The largest settlement in the parish is the seaside town of Bude. The parish also includes the market town of Stratton and the settlements of Flexbury, Poughill, Bush, Maer and Northcott north of Bude, and Upton, Lynstone, Thorne and Hele south of Bude.

At the 2021 census, it had a population of 10,589, which was slightly more than the 9,934 recorded at the 2011 census.

Bude–Stratton is part of the North Cornwall parliamentary constituency, represented since 2024 by Ben Maguire.

== History ==
Bude–Stratton corresponds to the combined area of the two ancient parishes of Stratton and Poughill. When elected district councils were established in 1894, both parishes were included in the Stratton Rural District. In 1900 a new urban district called "Stratton and Bude" was created from most of the parish of Stratton, including both its main settlements of Bude and Stratton and the hamlets of Upton and Lynstone, as well as the Flexbury area from the parish of Poughill. Stratton and Bude Urban District Council therefore took over district-level functions within its area from Stratton Rural District Council.

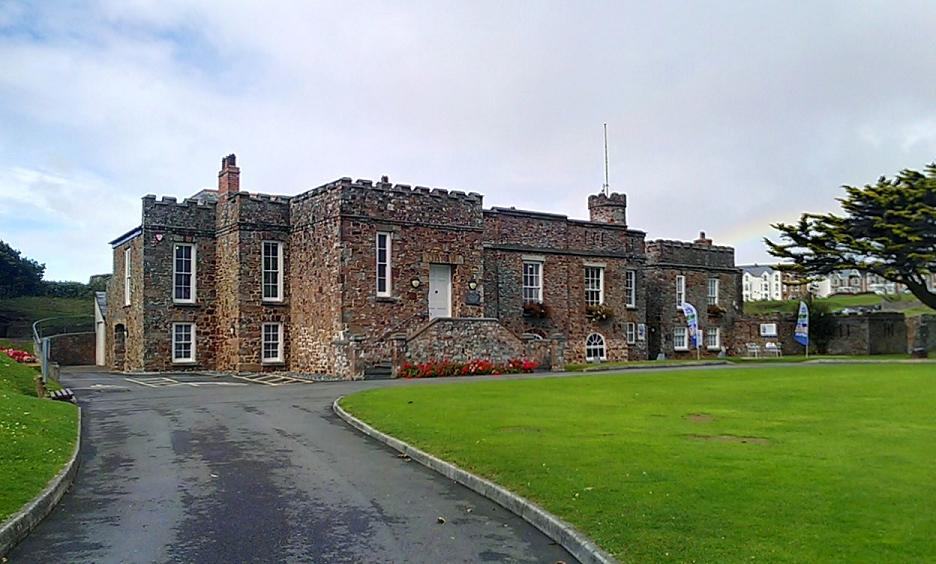
Bude Castle

In 1934 the urban district was enlarged to take in the residual rural parts of Stratton parish and the rest of Poughill parish, including the village. At the same time, the urban district's name was changed from "Stratton and Bude" to "Bude–Stratton". In 1947, Bude–Stratton Urban District Council bought Bude Castle (built 1830) to serve as its headquarters.

Bude–Stratton Urban District was abolished in 1974 under the Local Government Act 1972, with district-level functions passing to the new North Cornwall District Council. A successor parish called Bude–Stratton was created at the same time covering the area of the abolished urban district, with its parish council taking the name Bude–Stratton Town Council. North Cornwall was in turn abolished in 2009. Cornwall County Council then took on district-level functions, making it a unitary authority, and was renamed Cornwall Council.

The arms of the Bude-Stratton urban district council were: Arg. two bars wavy Az. within a bordure Sa. bezantee on a chief Gu. a cross formed of the field between two clarions Or. The Arms were transferred to Bude-Stratton Town Council by consent and grant of the College of Arms.

== Features ==
Compass Point storm tower was built in 1835.

== Governance ==
There are two tiers of local government covering Bude–Stratton, at parish (town) and unitary authority level: Bude–Stratton Town Council and Cornwall Council. The town council is based at the Parkhouse Centre in Bude.

== Twinning ==
Bude–Stratton is twinned with Ergue-Gaberic (An Erge Vras) in Brittany, France.

== Notable people ==
- John Bolitho, Grand bard of the Cornish Gorsedd
- Sir Goldsworthy Gurney, surgeon, gentleman scientist, inventor, and pioneer of applying steam power
- Sir Henry Lovell Goldsworthy Gurney, colonial administrator
