= Duckpool to Furzey Cove =

Protected area in Cornwall, England

- Site of Special Scientific Interest
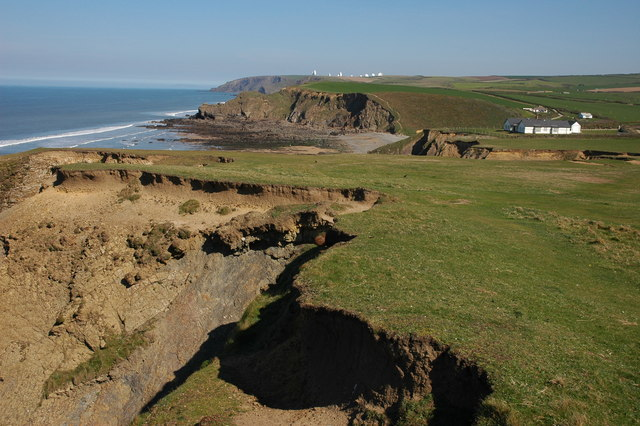
- Maer Cliff, to the south of the SSSI

- Location within Cornwall Location within England
- Location of Duckpool to Furzey Cove.
- Area of search: Cornwall
- Grid reference: SS200090
- Coordinates: 50.8565°N 4.5565°W
- Interest: Geological
- Area: 87.29 hectares (0.873 km^{2}; 0.337 sq mi)
- Notification date: 1996

Duckpool to Furzey Cove is a coastal Geological Conservation Review site and Site of Special Scientific Interest (SSSI) in north Cornwall, England, UK, noted for its geological interest.

== Geography ==
The 87-hectare (210-acre) site, notified in 1996, is located on the north Cornish coast, mainly in Kilkhampton civil parish, 2 miles (3.2 km) north of the town of Bude. It starts at Duckpool near the hamlet of Coombe in the north, following the shores of the Celtic Sea in the Atlantic Ocean, ending at Furzey Cove near Maer in the south.

The South West Coast Path runs through the SSSI and parts of the coastline are owned by the National Trust. This site is contiguous with the Bude Coast, Steeple Point to Marsland Mouth and Marsland to Clovelly Coast (in Devon) chain of SSSIs on this section of coastline.

== Geology ==
The geology of the site mainly is composed of alternating mudstones, shales and siltstones and is of very high national importance in the study of Upper Carboniferous rocks within Britain.
