= Bude (disambiguation) =

Bude is a seaside town in Cornwall, England,

Bude may also refer to:

- Bude, Mississippi, United States
- Guillaume Budé (1467–1540), a French scholar
- Bude-Light, an oil lamp named after the English town
- Bude Canal
- Bude railway station
