= Stratton, Cornwall =

Town in Cornwall, England

Coordinates: 50.830°N 4.519°W

Stratton: Cornish: Strasnedh
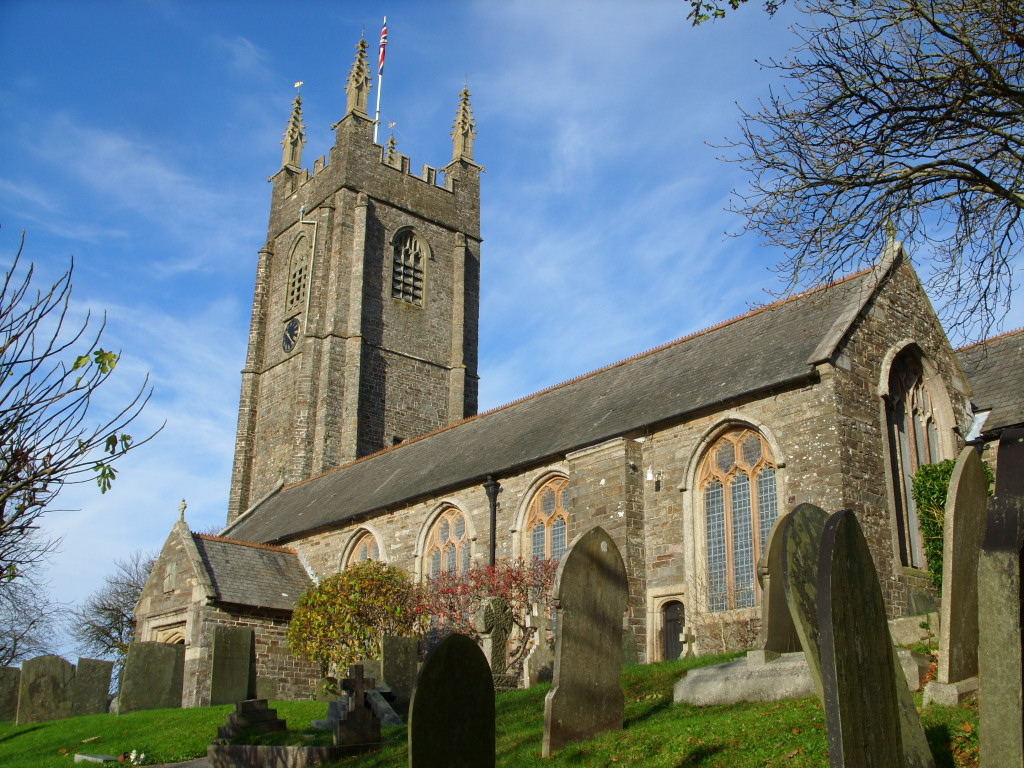

- Location within Cornwall
- Population: 2,044 (Built up area, 2022 estimate)
- OS grid reference: SS227065
- Civil parish: Bude-Stratton
- Unitary authority: Cornwall
- Ceremonial county: Cornwall
- Region: South West
- Country: England
- Sovereign state: United Kingdom
- Post town: BUDE
- Postcode district: EX23
- Dialling code: 01288
- Police: Devon and Cornwall
- Fire: Cornwall
- Ambulance: South Western
- UK Parliament: North Cornwall

Stratton (Cornish: Strasnedh [ˈstraznɛð], meaning flat valley of the River Neet) is a town in the parish of Bude-Stratton, in Cornwall, England. It is situated near the coastal town of Bude and the market town of Holsworthy. Stratton gave its name to one of the ten ancient hundreds of Cornwall. The Battle of Stratton during the English Civil War took place here on 16 May 1643. In 2022 it had an estimated population of 2,044.

== Etymology ==
The earliest form of the name in Old English is Strætneat deriving from the original Cornish "Strad-Neth", with Strad meaning "The flat-bottomed valley of the River" and Neth being the name of the river itself.

In common with most hydronymy in Western Europe, the name Neth is known to be Celtic or Pre-Celtic; however, the etymology of the name remains uncertain. A meaning of shining or brilliant has been suggested, as has a link to the older Indo-European root *-nedi (simply meaning river). Today, the river is commonly referred to as the Strat in English, from an erroneous back formation of Stratton ("town on the Strat").

The town likely shares its etymology with the river and town of Neath in South Wales and the River Nidd in Northern England. The river is known as both the River Neet and the River Strat.

== History ==
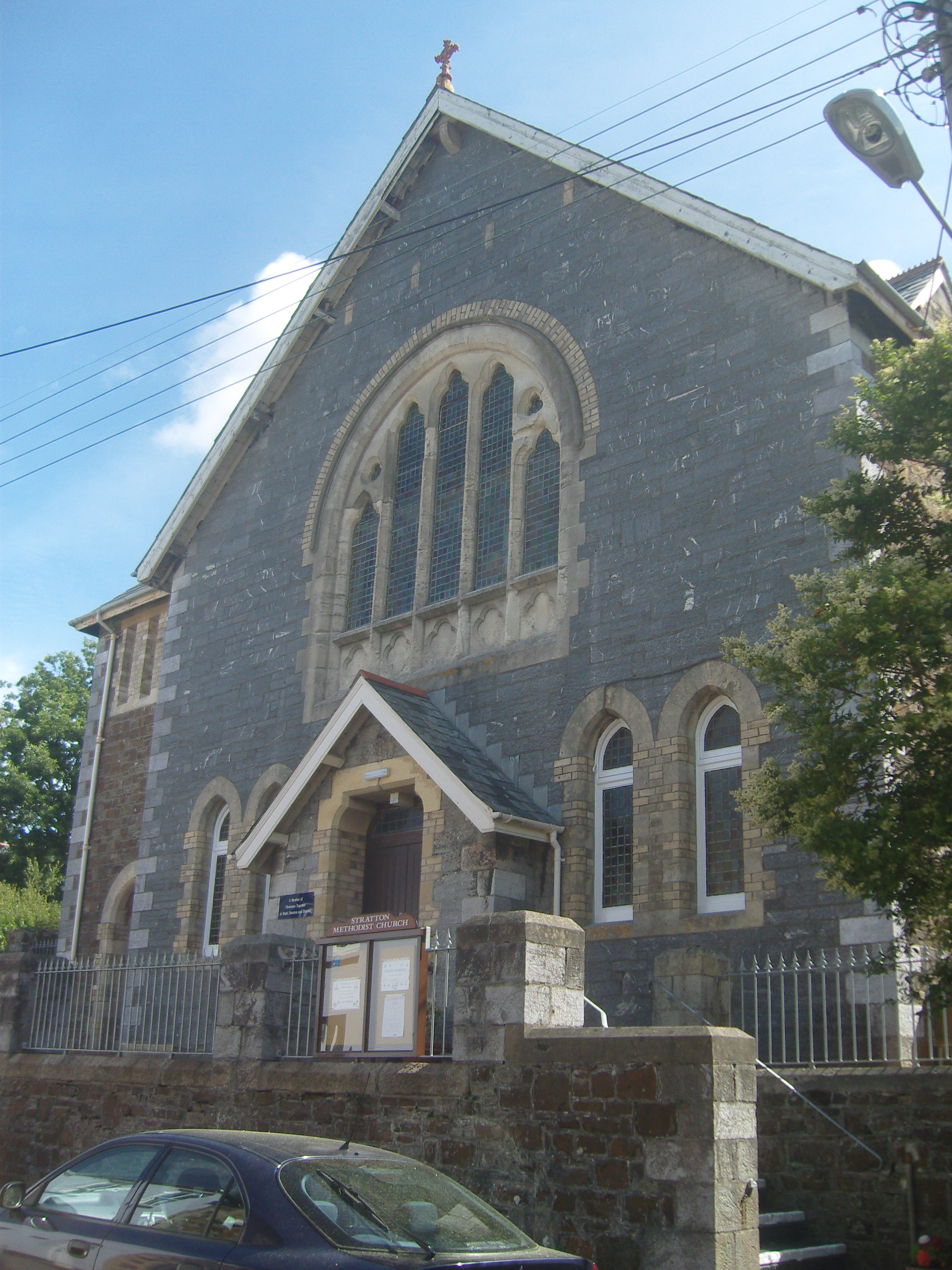
Stratton Methodist Church

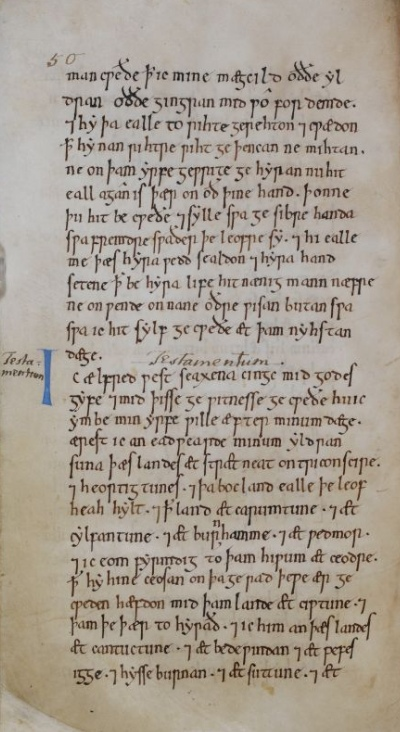
Will of Alfred the Great, AD 873–888, mentions Strætneat (11th-century copy, British Library Stowe MS 944, ff. 29v–33r)

The earliest known references to Stratton are found in King Alfred's Will of c. 880 and the Domesday survey of 1086. (For the Stratton Hundred: see under Government below.)

At the time of the Domesday Survey the manor of Stratton had land for 30 ploughs. There were 30 villeins, 20 smallholders and 20 slaves. There were 10 salt houses, 20 acres of woodland, 200 acres of pasture, 30 cattle and 300 sheep. Before the conquest the manor had been held by Bishop Osbern and Alfred the Marshal; its value in 1086 was £35-18-4d. Stratton Manor House on Diddies Road has now been converted into apartments.

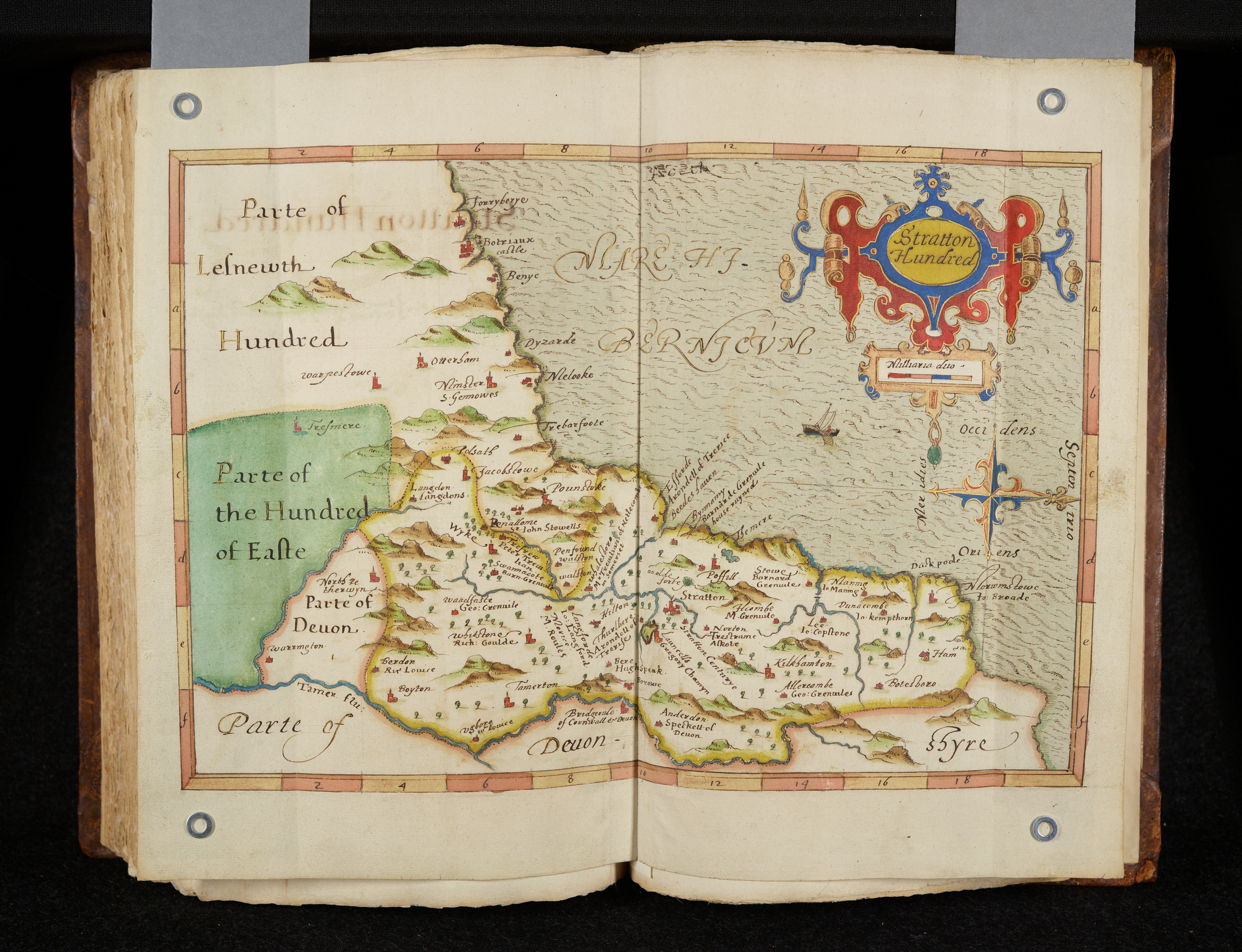
Norden's map of Stratton Hundred.

The town has given its name to a traditional folk ballad, "The Stratton Carol".

== Religion ==
St Andrew's Church, Stratton
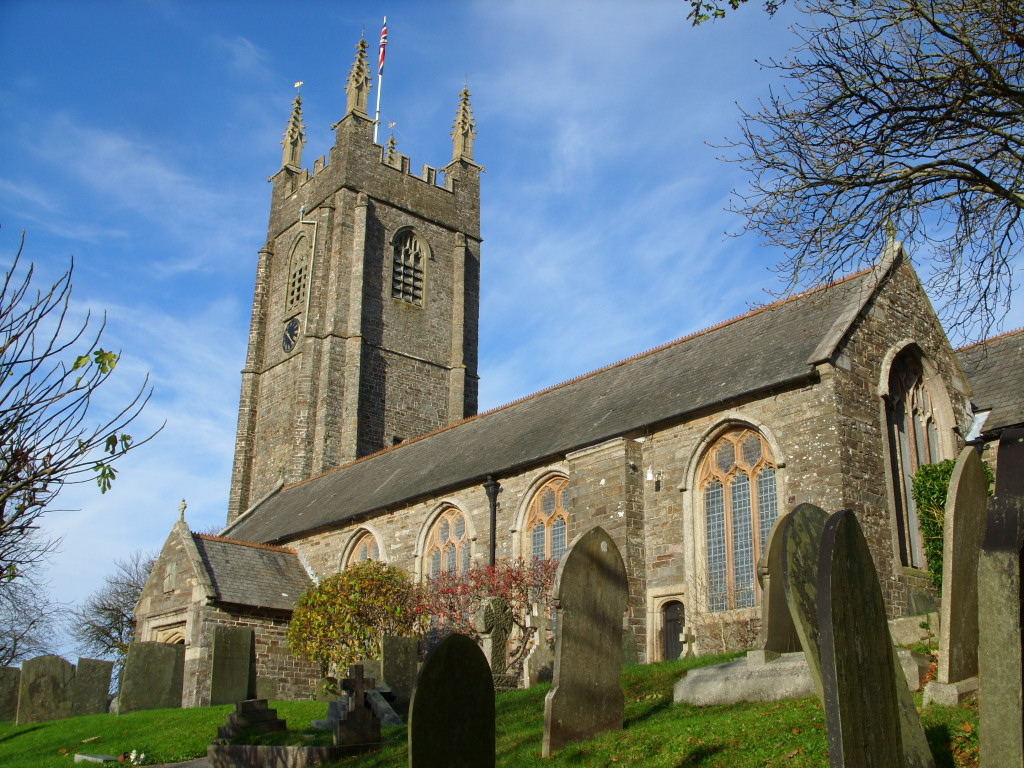
- Stratton Church
- St Andrew's Church, Stratton
- Denomination: Church of England

History
- Dedication: St Andrew

Administration
- Province: Canterbury
- Diocese: Truro
- Archdeaconry: Bodmin
- Deanery: Stratton
- Parish: Bude-Stratton

One of the most prominent buildings in Stratton is the 12th-century Norman church dedicated to Saint Andrew which holds a central and elevated position within the town. It is a Grade I listed building and contains a brass to Admiral Sir John Arundell of Trerice, 1561.

There were also other chapels around the village, indicating an historically large population. Many of these are now derelict, however, or have now been converted, suggesting a large population decline. A large population is also supported by the existence of the large tithe barn, large enough to hold the tax of one-tenth of their earnings/produce that all villagers paid to the church. The area around Cot Hill was an important sanctuary for pilgrims travelling the pilgrimage route to Hartland during Medieval times.

== Justice ==
The town once had a jail, a police station and a courthouse, but the police station has now been moved to Bude, the jail demolished and the courthouse converted into two dwellings. The door of the jail, marked "CLINK", is still visible in the church porch. The following quotation indicates Stratton's importance as a centre of justice: "As Stratton Town and the surrounding villages grew, the need to administer civil and criminal law from an appropriate location was necessary."

== Government ==
The name Stratton was given to the unit of government for the administration of justice and taxation during Saxon times, known as a 'hundred'. Stratton was the head of its hundred due to its importance in comparison to that of the local towns and villages, including Kilkhampton, Marhamchurch, Boyton, Jacobstow, Whitstone, Stratton itself, Poughill, Bridgerule, Week St Mary, Launcells, North Tamerton and Morwenstow.

The hundred is an indicator of Stratton's importance not only for these reasons, but also because in the whole of Cornwall, there were only nine hundreds and all of them had their own courts. This suggests that not only did Stratton have a courthouse, it was probably the only one in the Stratton Hundred. (At the time of Domesday Book there were only seven hundreds: the hundred of Trigg was later divided into Trigg, Lesnewth and Stratton. Stratton manor was the head manor of Trigg Hundred in Domesday Book.) Hundreds were primarily used as areas for the administration of justice, but gradually lost their functions. The remaining judicial functions were transferred to county courts in 1867 and their last remaining liabilities transferred to local police forces in 1886.

Stratton was an ancient parish. As well as Stratton itself, the parish also included Bude and surrounding rural areas, including the hamlets of Upton and Lynstone.

When elected parish and district councils were established by the Local Government Act 1894, the parish of Stratton was included in the Stratton Rural District. In 1900 most of the civil parish of Stratton, including the towns of Stratton and Bude, together with Upton and Lynstone, and also Flexbury from the civil parish of Poughill, were transferred from the Rural District to the new Stratton and Bude Urban District. The remainder of the civil parishes of Stratton and Poughill were transferred to the urban district on 1 April 1934, which was renamed Bude–Stratton at the same time. A civil parish of Stratton continued to exist between 1900 and 1934, but it only covered the residual eastern rural fringes of the old parish that had not been included in the urban district. In 1931, the last census before its abolition, the Stratton parish had a population of 117.

Both the Urban District and Stratton Rural District were abolished in 1974 and became part of North Cornwall District, itself abolished in 2009 when the present Cornwall Council was formed.

== Trade and industry ==
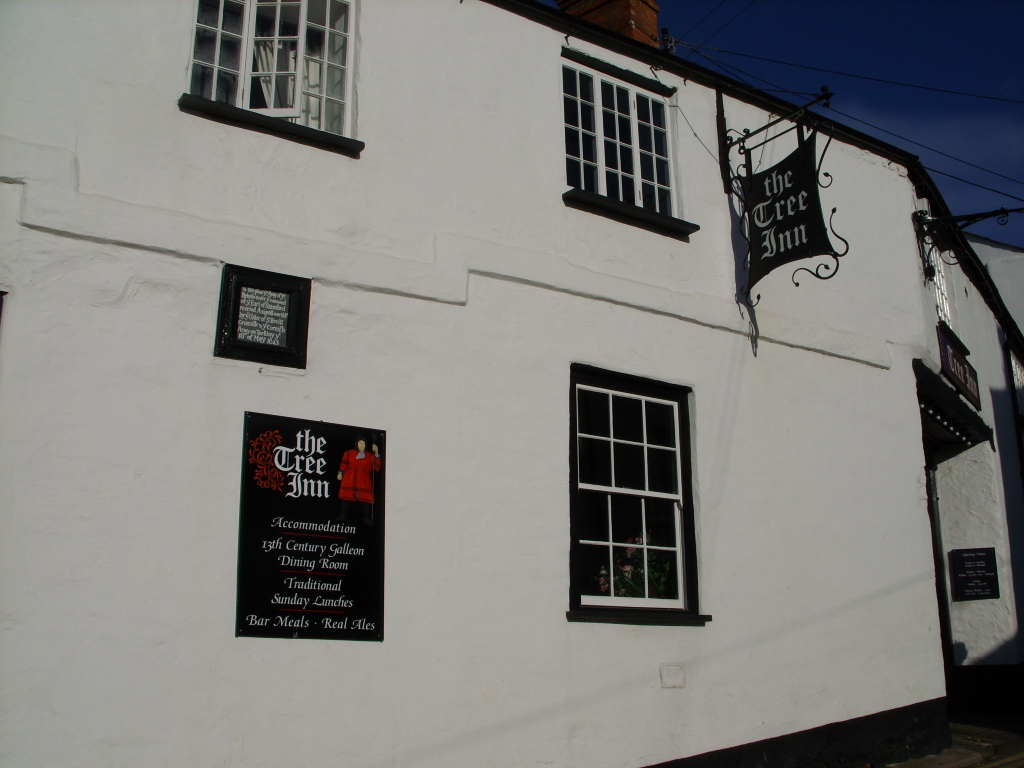
The Tree Inn

Trade and industry greatly affected Stratton's popularity; it had a thriving leather and agricultural trade. During medieval times it dealt in leather. Evidence of this is the road named after the trade. Poundfield area was where the animals were kept; Stratton also housed tanning pits and a rack park, where the leather was stretched. There is also evidence of farming in the milking parlours, barns and stalls that are made from cob, a traditional building material, and the Old Malt House shows where ale was produced in the church-owned brewery. During medieval times herbs and spices were also considered important for medicinal purposes as well as others, and Stratton was famous for having an abundance of wild garlic.

Trade events such as markets and fairs were a regular occurrence in Stratton and people would come from all around to attend. Much of the evidence for events and trades in Stratton is subtle, for example, street names like Market Street and Poundfield Lane. Stratton had up to 14 pubs, although some were houses where people brewed beer themselves. Many have now been knocked down or converted, but some, such as the Tree Inn, are still running, despite perhaps fewer customers than they would have expected before Bude became the main town. Although many of the shops that once lined the streets have now been converted into homes, the large front windows still hint at the lives led by the inhabitants when Stratton was the most important town in the area.

=== 19th and 20th centuries ===
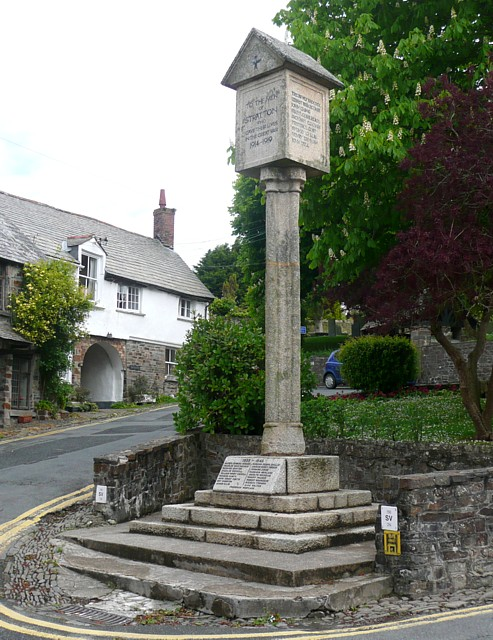
Stratton war memorial

Trade directories allow comparison of the two towns. For example, in 1844, when Stratton had six shoemakers, Bude had only one, although Slater's Trade Directory 1852–1853 shows the period in which Bude was beginning to catch up, although Stratton was still thriving. One of the main factors which led to the demise of Stratton's influence was New Road which directed traffic away from the centre of Stratton in the early 20th century. The bypass was then built in 1950 when Stratton was well and truly defeated. Following the 1960s rail closures Stratton and Bude became the two towns most remote from the rail network in England. Despite the downfall of Stratton, it still managed to keep the hospital and surgery running although the union and workhouse from the 1830s were no longer operating.

== Cornish wrestling ==
Cornish wrestling tournaments, for prizes, were held in Stratton in the 1700s and 1800s.

== Notable people ==
- Sir William Henry Sleeman (1788–1856), a British soldier and administrator in British India.
- Richard Maynard (1832–1907), a Canadian photographer known mainly for his landscape views, born in Stratton

== See also ==
- Battle of Stratton
- List of topics related to Cornwall
