= Compass Point Storm Tower =

- The Pepperpot
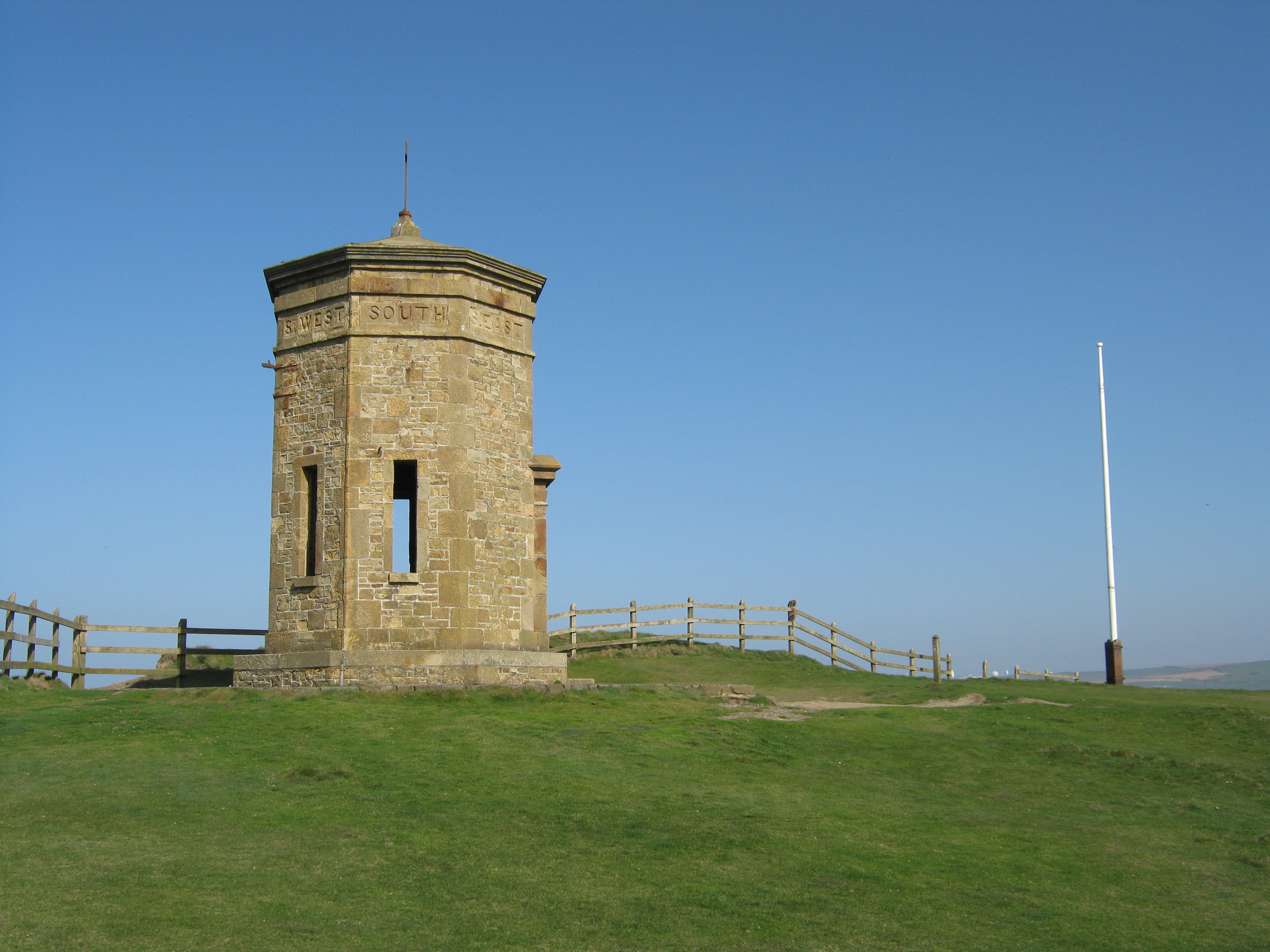

- Location within Cornwall
- 50.8284691°N 4.5558962°W
- Type: Lookout tower
- Location: Compass Point, Bude, Cornwall, England

History
- Built for: Sir Thomas Dyke Acland, 10th Baronet

Site notes
- Architect: George Wightwick

Listed Building – Grade II
- Official name: The Storm Tower
- Designated: 9 September 1985
- Reference no.: 1141875

The Storm Tower at Compass Point, Bude–Stratton, Cornwall, England, is an octagonal lookout tower, modelled on the Tower of the Winds in Athens, Greece. It is known locally as the Pepperpot.

The tower was built in 1835 on the instructions of Sir Thomas Dyke Acland, 10th Baronet, to a design by George Wightwick, as a place from which coastguards could observe ships on the adjacent Atlantic Ocean.

Historic England describe it thus:

Roughly-dressed stone brought to course with freestone quoins... on plinth with 3 granite steps up to entrance on east side. Entrance has entablature and pediment on freestone pilasters. Each side has slit window with stone sill, those to north-east and north-west blocked. The points of the compass are carved as a frieze in sans-serif below the moulded cornice. Low pyramidal roof with moulded base to cross formerly surmounting tower. Interior has slate floor and brick dressings to slit windows.

The current roof is not original. As built, the tower was aligned to magnetic north, but polar drift means this is now seven degrees out.

The tower sits on a sandstone and shale cliff that is described as friable and which is subject to erosion, averaging 1 metre (1.1 yd) a year, but with the potential for a 25-metre (27 yd) loss at any time. As a result, the tower had to be moved a short distance from the cliff edge in 1881. Because of the ongoing threat of erosion, the tower was again dismantled and reconstructed 100 metres (110 yd) further inland, at a cost of around £450,000, over a six-month period starting in late April 2023 and finishing in March 2024. Funding was provided by the National Lottery Heritage Fund (£249,362), public crowdfunding (£58,000), Cornwall Council (£50,000) and Bude-Stratton town council (£40,000). The work was undertaken by specialist contractors Sally Strachey Historic Conservation.

The tower has been Grade II listed since September 1985, giving it legal protection against unauthorised alteration or demolition.
