= Marsland Valley =

Nature reserve in Cornwall and Devon, England

Coordinates: 50.927°N 4.515°W

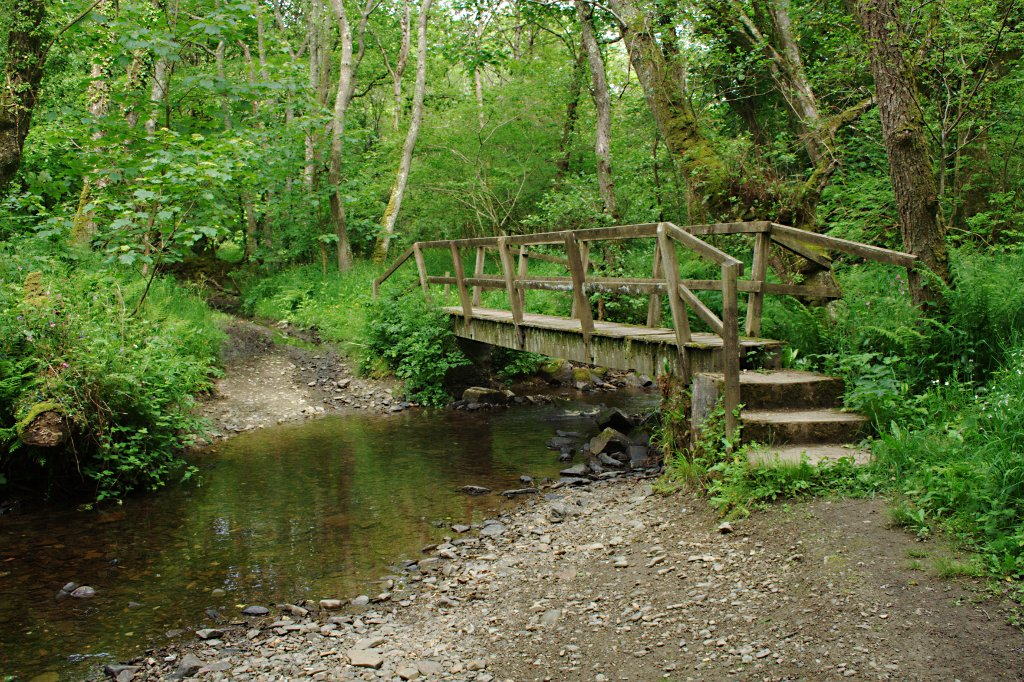
A ford in the wood

Marsland Valley is a nature reserve situated in two large valleys which straddle the northern end of the Devon-Cornwall border. It is a designated nature reserve jointly managed by the Devon Wildlife Trust and the Cornwall Wildlife Trust. The reserve is a Special Area of Conservation, and it forms part of two Sites of Special Scientific Interest: Steeple Point to Marsland Mouth on the Cornish side and Marsland to Clovelly Coast in Devon.

The valley is situated near the villages of Gooseham and Morwenstow, approximately ten miles north of the Cornish Atlantic Coast resort of Bude. The watercourse along the valley, which discharges directly into the sea, at Marsland Mouth, is called Marsland Water. The land was donated by the late Christopher Cadbury (former President of the Royal Society for Nature Conservation 1962-1986) to the county Trusts.

Roe deer and purple hairstreak butterflies can both be seen here, as well as the extremely rare pearl-bordered fritillary and the small pearl-bordered fritillary.

On the south-facing wooded slope towards Gooseham Mill the trees are coppiced to create clearings, and vegetation is thinned to keep it low so that flowers and insects can flourish.

Westward on the coast, Marsland Mouth denotes the western end of the North Devon Coast AONB. It also includes part of the Hartland section of the Cornwall Area of Outstanding Natural Beauty (AONB).
