= Poughill =

Village in Cornwall, England

Coordinates: 50.841°N 4.526°W

Poughill: Cornish: Fentengwilkyn
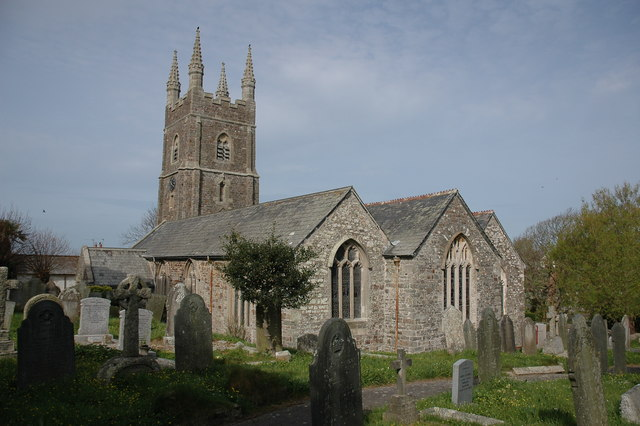
- St Olaf's Church

- Location within Cornwall
- Population: 677 (2015 estimate)
- OS grid reference: SS222078
- Civil parish: Bude-Stratton
- Unitary authority: Cornwall
- Ceremonial county: Cornwall
- Region: South West
- Country: England
- Sovereign state: United Kingdom
- Post town: BUDE
- Postcode district: EX23
- Dialling code: 01288
- Police: Devon and Cornwall
- Fire: Cornwall
- Ambulance: South Western
- UK Parliament: North Cornwall

Poughill (pronounced "Pofil" or "Puffil") (Cornish: Fentengwilkyn) is a village in the civil parish of Bude-Stratton, in the Cornwall district, in north-east Cornwall, England. It is located one mile north of Bude. In 2015 it had an estimated population of 677.

== History ==
Poughill is mentioned in the Domesday Book as Pochehelle. The name is of uncertain origin. It may be from Old English pohha 'pouch', used in the topographical sense of a deep valley, or Pohha used as a personal name or nickname, and hylle 'hill' or wylle 'spring'. So the meaning could be "hill by a deep valley", "spring in a deep valley", "hill of a man named Pohha" or "spring of a man named Pohha".

Poughill was an ancient parish, in the hundred of Stratton. It became a civil parish in 1866. In 1900 the developing area of Flexbury was transferred from the parish to the new Bude–Stratton Urban District. On 1 April 1934 a small part of the parish was transferred to Kilkhampton, the remainder of the parish was transferred to Bude–Stratton, and the civil parish was abolished. At the 1931 census (the last before the abolition of the parish), Poughill had a population of 413.

=== Battle of Stamford Hill ===
The Battle of Stamford Hill, also known as the Battle of Stratton, was fought on the outskirts of Poughill on 16 May 1643. Each May, on the closest weekend to the anniversary, there is a two-day re-enactment of the battle, fought over the Saturday and Sunday, together with a procession through the streets of neighbouring Stratton village.

== Notable buildings ==
Notable old houses in Poughill include Burshill Manor (a Grade II listed building), an open hall house dating from the early 16th century, and Church House, a Grade II* listed building dating from the early 16th century.

The village's water-mill is located on the footpath towards Bush. Lying at the foot of Trevalgus Hill in thick woodland, it is believed to have been a manorial mill for Trevalgus Manor. The mill was powered by the stream which runs south towards Stratton called the Stratt. Part of the mill building was constructed of timbers from ships wrecked along the coastline.

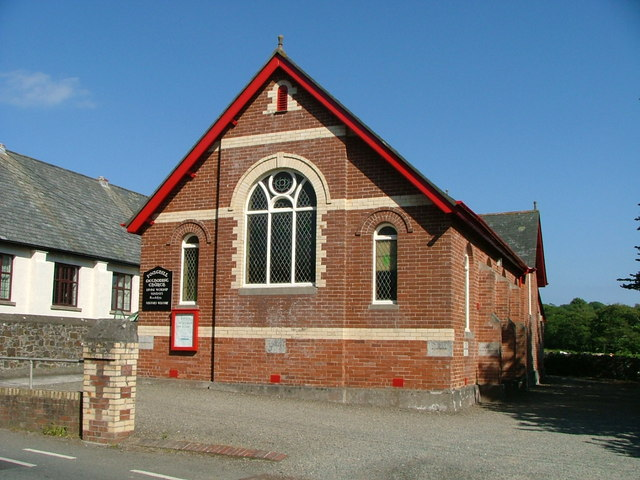

=== St Olaf's Church ===
At the heart of the village is St Olaf's church. The church is of exceptional interest and dates from the 14th century. The frescoes date from about 1470, and depict St Christopher.

== Notable residents ==
During the latter half of his life, Sir Goldsworthy Gurney, the surgeon, gentleman scientist, inventor, and pioneer of applying steam power, lived in Reeds, a small house on the outskirts of the village, until his death in 1875.

Sir Henry Lovell Goldsworthy Gurney, a Malaysian colonial administrator assassinated by Communist extremists during the Malayan Emergency, was born here in 1898.

== Cornish wrestling ==
Cornish wrestling tournaments, for prizes, were held in Poughill in the 1800s.
