= Steeple Point to Marsland Mouth =

Coastal Site of Special Scientific Interest in Cornwall, England

- Site of Special Scientific Interest
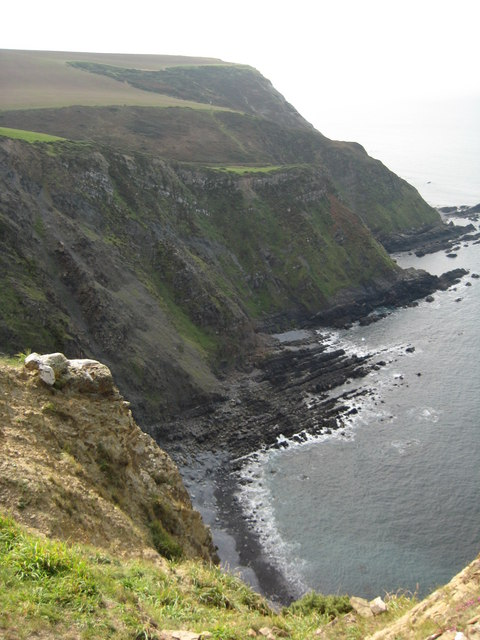
- Cliffs at Yeol Mouth, to the north of the site

- Location within Cornwall Location within England
- Location of Steeple Point to Marsland Mouth.
- Area of search: Cornwall
- Grid reference: SS212174
- Coordinates: 50.9149°N 4.5599°W
- Interest: Biological
- Area: 342.8 hectares (3.43 km^{2}; 1.32 sq mi)
- Notification date: 1973

Steeple Point to Marsland Mouth is a coastal Site of Special Scientific Interest (SSSI) in Cornwall, England, UK, noted for its biological characteristics.

== Geography ==
The 343-hectare (850-acre) site, notified in 1973, is situated on the north Cornish coast, within Morwenstow civil parish, 5 miles (8.0 km) north of the town of Bude. It starts at Steeple Point in the south, following the shores of the Celtic Sea in the Atlantic Ocean to Marsland Mouth in the north, which is on the Cornwall-Devon border. This site is contiguous with the Bude Coast, Duckpool to Furzey Cove and Marsland to Clovelly Coast (in Devon) chain of SSSIs on this section of coastline.

The South West Coast Path runs through the SSSI and parts of the coastline are owned by the National Trust. The SSSI also covers the Cornish side of Marsland Valley nature reserve, jointly owned by the Devon and Cornwall Wildlife Trusts.

== Wildlife and ecology ==
The SSSI is sited on a geological formation of Upper Carboniferous Culm Measures, which support a variety of habitats including maritime grassland, woodland, maritime heath, scrub, bodies of water as well as rocky foreshore and cliffs.

=== Flora ===
Amongst the cliff edge grassland buckshorn plantain (Plantago coronopus), carline thistle (Carlina vulgaris), red fescue (Festuca rubra), thrift (Armeria maritima) and wild thyme (Thymus praecox) can be found. Along with some of these species bell heather (Erica cinerea), heather (Calluna vulgaris), burnet rose (Rosa pimpinellifolia), catsear (Hypochaeris), eyebright (of the genus Euphrasia), western gorse (Ulex gallii) and yarrow (Achillea millefolium) grow in the heathlands.

=== Fauna ===
The SSSI supports a wide variety of invertebrates, in particular butterflies and 14 species of dragonfly.

Uncommon species of butterfly found include brown hairstreak (Thecla betulae), grayling (Hipparchia semele), grizzled skipper (Pyrgus malvae), high brown fritillary (Argynnis cydippe) and marsh fritillary (Euphydryas aurinia). The coastline of the SSSI supported one of the last known British colonies of breeding large blue butterfly (Maculinea arion), which was declared nationally extinct in 1979. Thereafter, from 1983 the butterfly was reintroduced to the country, including at locations on this site.

The coastal habitats support bird-life including the great black-backed gull (Larus marinus) and European stonechat (Saxicola rubicola), while the common buzzard (Buteo buteo), dipper (Cinclus cinclus), sparrowhawk (Accipiter nisus) and wood warbler (Phylloscopus sibilatrix) can be found in the woodland areas.

Roe deer (Capreolus capreolus) are also found in the Marsland Valley section of the site.
