= Maer, Cornwall =

Coastal hamlet in north Cornwall, England

Coordinates: 50.83912°N 4.55075°W

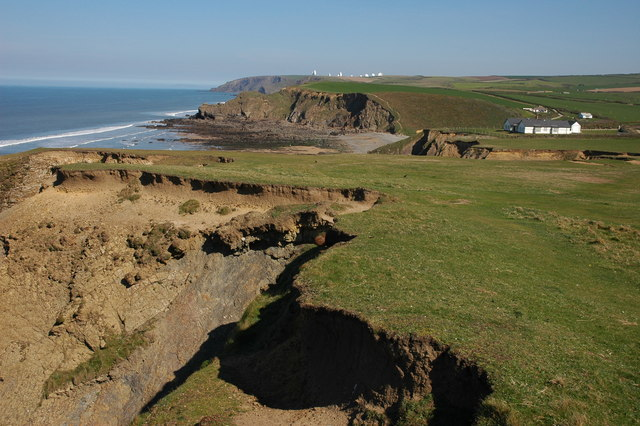
Maer Cliff, Cornwall

Maer is a coastal hamlet in north Cornwall, England, United Kingdom. It is situated one mile (1.6 km) northeast of Bude at grid reference SS 205 075 in the civil parish of Bude-Stratton (where the 2011 census population is included.).

The hamlet contains the only "known probable tithe barn" in Cornwall, which was extensively restored and modernised following a purchase in 2012. Its restoration, by architects The Bazeley Partnership, was featured on the Channel 4 programme Homes By the Sea.

The National Trust maintains Maer Down and Maer Cliff immediately west of the hamlet. The South West Coast Path runs along the clifftop past Maer.
