= Thorne, Cornwall =

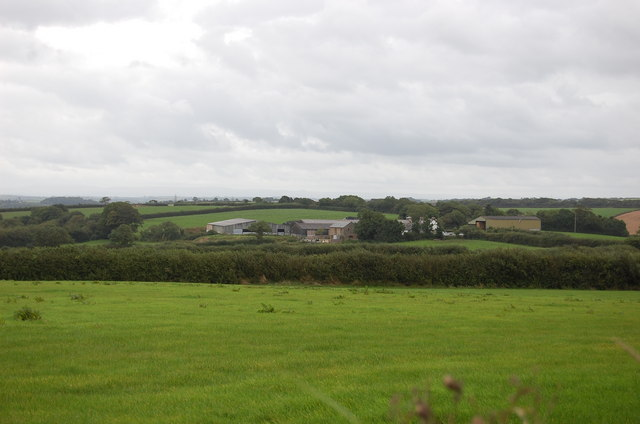
Thorne Farm, Whitstone

Thorne is the name of two hamlets in north Cornwall, England, United Kingdom. One is on the A3073 road near Bude and the other near Whitstone. Thorne, Whitstone, was a manor in medieval times and had in 1086 land for one plough and 20 acres of pasture.
