= Sandymouth Beach =

Sandy beach in Cornwall, England

Coordinates: 50.861°N 4.555°W

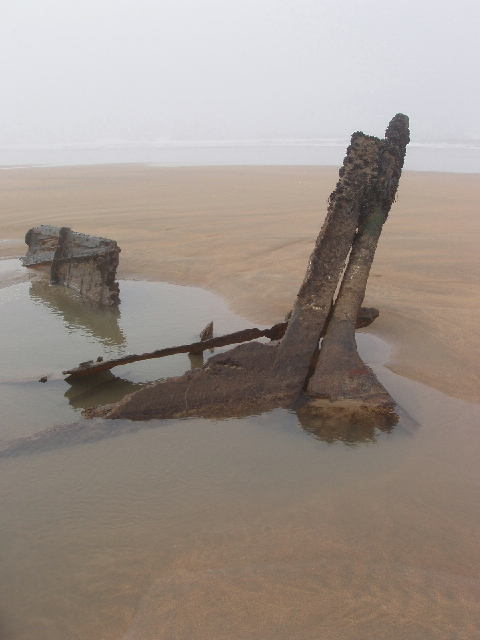
Shipwreck remains at Menachurch Point

Sandymouth is a beach three miles (5 km) north of Bude in Cornwall, England, United Kingdom.

== Topography ==
The area is formed from cliffs and rock formations (see Geology of Cornwall) with a broad sandy beach below. It lies between two headlands, Steeple Point and Menachurch Point, close to the small settlement of Houndapit and is managed by the National Trust.

The seabed off the coast of Sandymouth Beach slopes sharply which produces strong surf. The coast around Bude has a long history of surfing and Sandymouth Beach is a popular surfing spot.

Sandymouth is the longest of Bude's beaches. It is over one mile (1.6 km) long at low tide and lies between two headlands, Steeple Point (Warren Gutter) and Menachurch Point (The Dragons Head). It is situated three miles north of Bude in North Cornwall, England, United Kingdom. Sandymouth can be accessed along the beach at lower tides and via the South-west coastal cliff path at mid to higher tides.

The beach is backed by cliffs rich in geological mastery, waterfalls and fingers of hard rock that jut out from where the cliffs lie. This beach's closest settlements are Houndapitt, Stibb and Stowe Barton. The area of Sandymouth is managed by the National Trust, seasonally patrolled by the RNLI beach lifeguard and has a licensed surf school offer surfing tuition. There are toilets, a car park and a café that is open for most of the year.

The seabed off the coast of Sandymouth Beach slopes sharply which produces stronger surf than neighbouring beaches. Its northerly position makes it more exposed to small summer waves and its beach topography helps it to handle larger swells. The coast around Bude has a long history of surfing and Sandymouth Beach has always been a popular surfing spot.
