= Bude Sea Pool =

Outdoor swimming pool in Bude, Cornwall, England

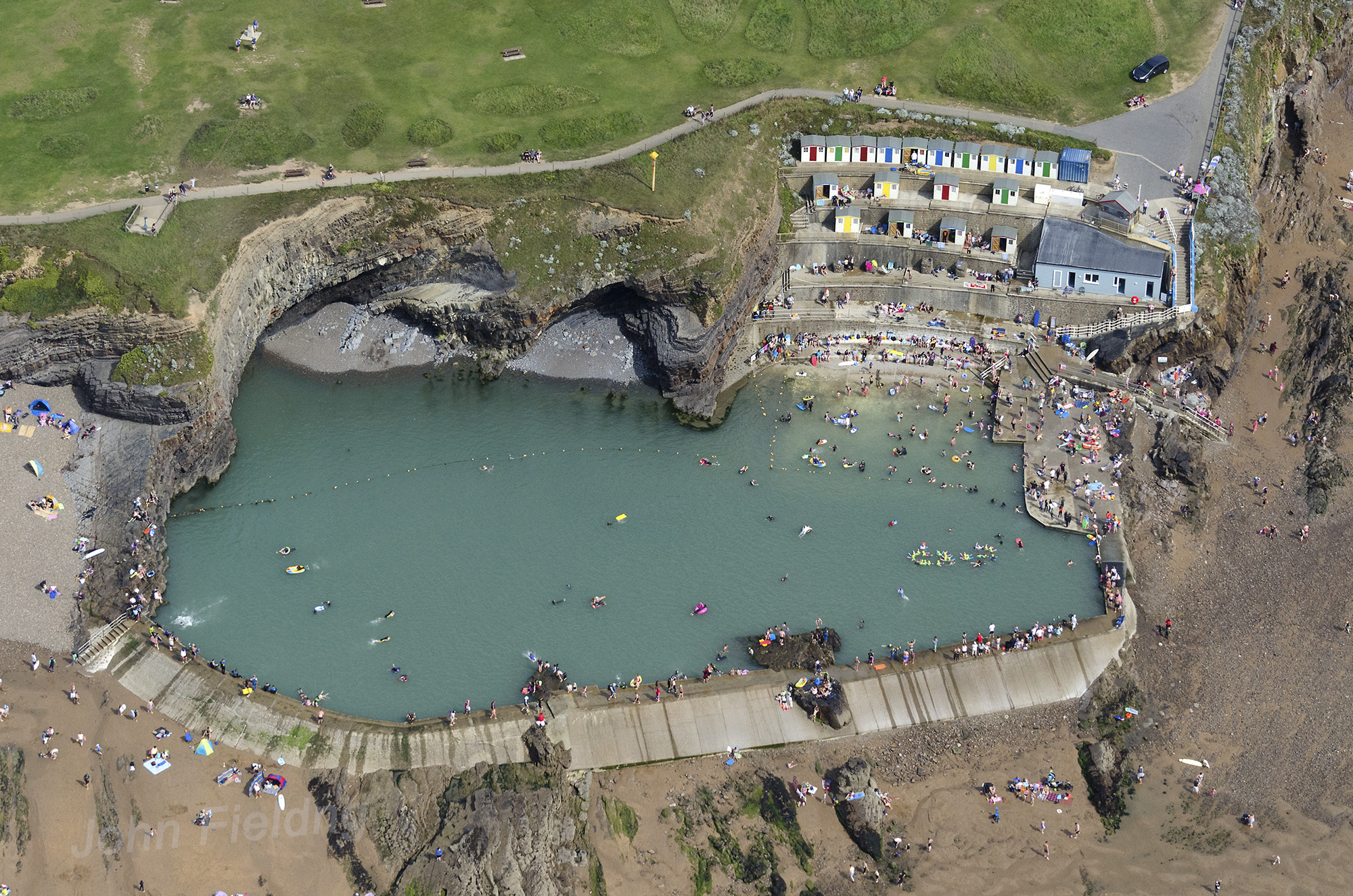
- 2016 photo
- Interactive map of Bude Sea Pool
- Location: Summerleaze Beach, Bude, Cornwall, England
- Coordinates: 50.832637°N 4.553809°W
- Type: tidal, seawater, lido
- Dimensions: Length: 290 feet (88 m); Width: 140 feet (43 m)

Construction
- Opened: 1930

Website
- Bude Sea Pool

Bude Sea Pool is a partially man-made tidal swimming pool or lido in the rocks at Summerleaze Beach, Bude, Cornwall.

== History ==
In 1930, the Thynne family put up half the money to create the pool and its sunbathing terraces.

== Overview ==
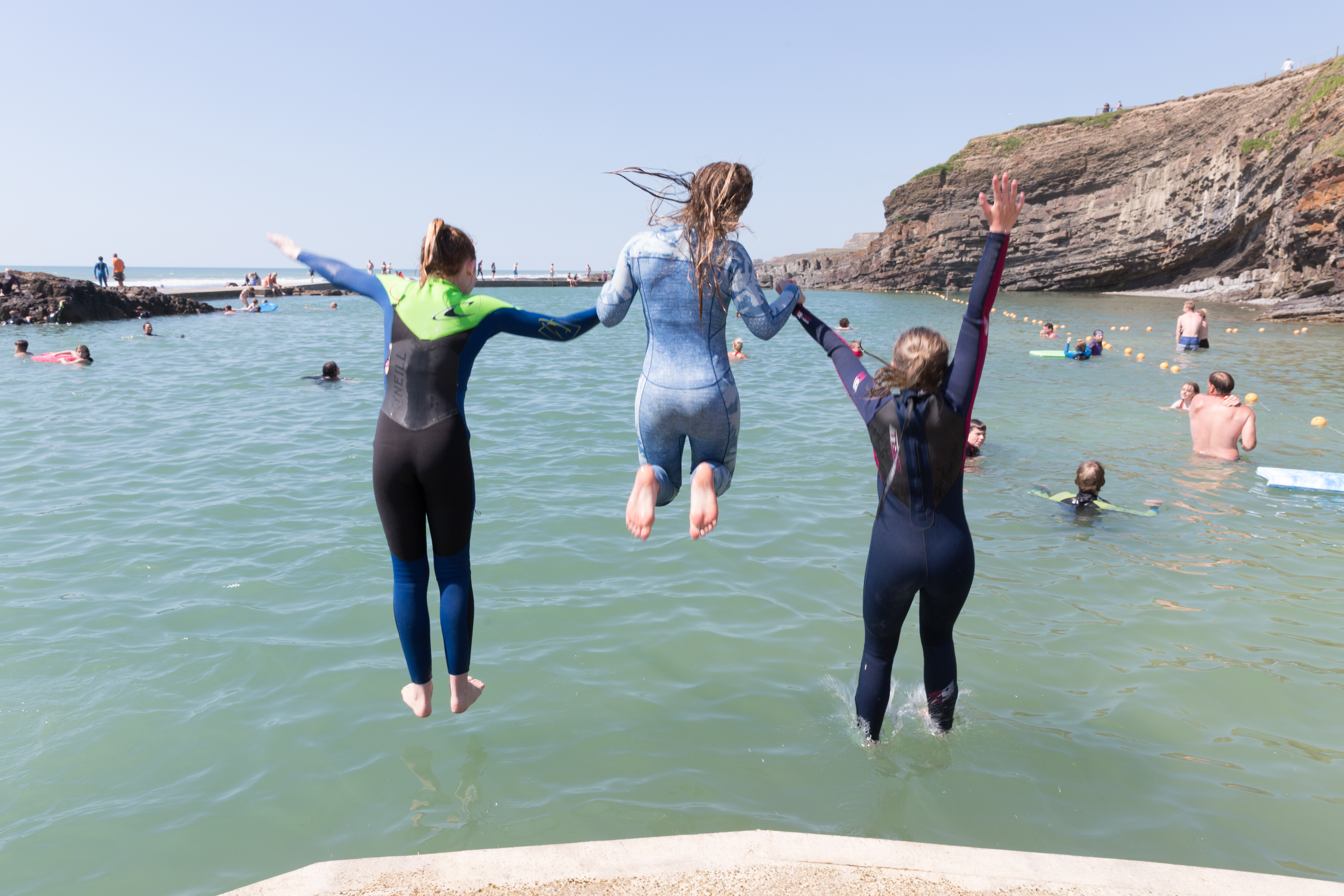
Bude Sea Pool diving event

Its size is 290 × 140 feet (88 × 43 m; approximate dimensions, as the pool is not symmetrical) with an area of about 3,500 m^{2}. The volume is about 4,000 m^{3} or 880,000 gallons, depending on how much sand the sea washes in.

RNLI and the Bude Surf Lifesaving Club use the pool for training and exams.

The pool is open 365 days a year, but only lifeguarded by RNLI during high seasons. On 19 October 2010 BBC Cornwall reported that the pool may face funding cuts as part of Cornwall Council's spending review. The possibility of cuts has drawn significant levels of protest from residents of Bude and beyond.

The Friends of Bude Sea Pool, a volunteer charity organisation, was formed in May 2011. The group aims to preserve, improve and enhance the sea pool as an amenity for the benefit of the community and visitors to the town.
