= Northcott, Cornwall =

Hamlet in United Kingdom

Coordinates: 50°51′01″N 4°32′15″W

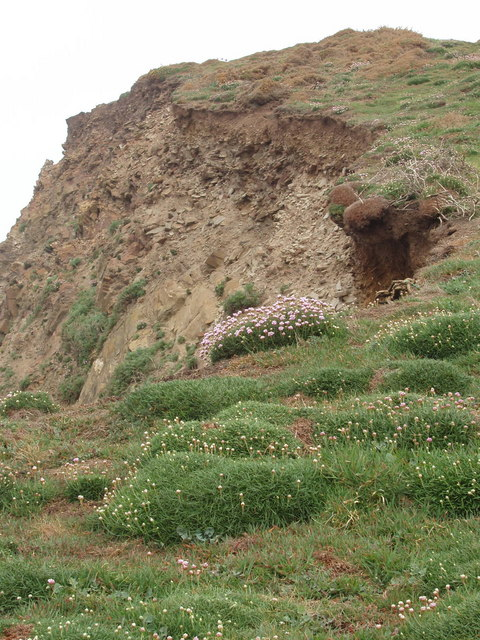
Cliff near Northcott Mouth

Northcott is a hamlet in Cornwall, England. Northcott is north of Bude and on the coast close to Northcott Mouth.
