= River Strat =

River in north Cornwall, England

Coordinates: 50°49′47″N 4°33′08″W

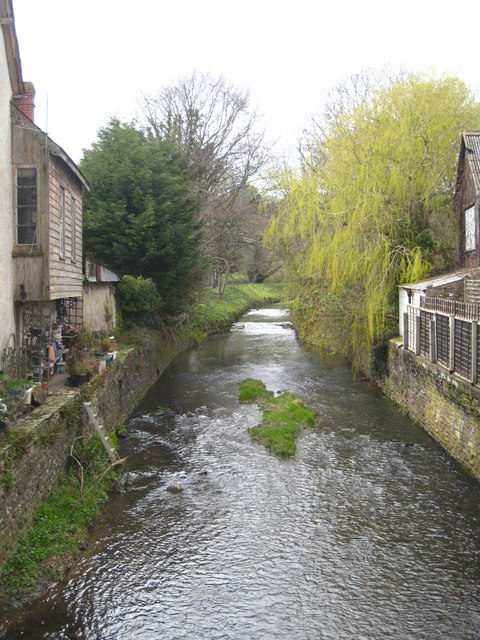
The River Strat in Stratton

The River Strat is a river in the northernmost part of Cornwall in southwest England. The Strat flows for 12.7 miles (20.4 km) to the sea at Bude, having risen to the south of Kilkhampton. It flows initially in a generally southwesterly direction through Stratton to a meeting with its major tributary, the River Neet at Helebridge. The river then turns abruptly to the north-northwest, parallel to the coast which it meets at Bude Haven. The Neet rises to the east of Week St Mary and flows north and northwest to its confluence with the Strat. Other tributaries rise to the west of Week St Mary. The section downstream from the vicinity of Helebridge is accompanied by the now disused Bude Canal. The rivers are home to trout, lamprey and eels. The Strat is sometimes also referred to as the River Neet. Older forms of the name of Stratton include Straetneat, one of the meanings of which may be the 'valley of the (river known as) Neat'.
