= George Wightwick =

British architect (1802–1872)

- Born: 26 August 1802; Flintshire, Wales
- Died: 9 July 1872 (aged 69); Portishead
- Occupation: Architect
- Buildings: Royal Cornwall Polytechnic Society, Falmouth

George Wightwick (26 August 1802 – 9 July 1872) was a British architect based in Plymouth, and possibly the first architectural journalist.

In addition to his architectural practice, he developed his skills and the market for architectural journalism. His views of church design disagreed with those of churchmen with power to commission new churches and this work dropped off after he published his ideas in Weale's Quarterly papers on Architecture in 1844/5. He married twice but had no children and died at Portishead on 9 July 1872.

== Life and work ==
=== Early years ===
Wightwick was born in Alyn Bank, near Mold, Flintshire, Wales and trained in London under Edward Lapidge. Following a year of travel and study in Italy, he published Select Views of Roman Antiquities (1828) .

=== Plymouth ===
In the late 1820s, Wightwick moved to Plymouth, and worked with John Foulston, succeeding to Foulston's practice after six months. From then until 1852, when he retired to Bristol, he completed many public and domestic buildings, mostly in Plymouth, Devon and Cornwall, including Christ Church, Eton Place, North Road, Plymouth (1846)

Wightwick, who was a member of The Plymouth Institution (now The Plymouth Athenaeum), was well known in Plymouth as an architect and as an amateur actor and comedian.

He completed designs by Foulston for Bodmin County Lunatic Asylum and designed the Plymouth Mechanics' Institute, Athenaeum Terrace, the Esplanade, the Devon and Cornwall Female Orphan Asylum and the Post Office at Devonport.

In Devon, he designed Calverleigh Court, and Watermouth Castle, near Ilfracombe.

=== Work in Cornwall ===
Among the buildings that he designed in Cornwall were Luxtowe House in Liskeard, Trevarno near Helston, Penquite Manor at Golant, Compass Point storm tower near Bude, and alterations to Tregrehan House at St Blazey.

In The Buildings of England: Cornwall, Nikolaus Pevsner identifies as Wightwick's work St Michael and All Angels, Bude (1835), St Mary's at Portreath (1841) (which he calls "rather depressing") Probus Vicarage (1839), St Luke's, Tideford (1845), and Tregrehan House near St Blazey ("Late Georgian ... of granite, seven bays, with lower projecting wings and a one-storeyed colonnade of piers of Ionic columns across five bays of the front"), and St John's, Treslothan (1841).

View of the RCPS building designed by George Wightwick

Raymond L. Brett has identified Wightwick as the architect of the Royal Cornwall Polytechnic Society building in Falmouth.

=== Networking ===
The ODNB articles relate how Wightwick used his social networking skills to develop his practice. An example of this is his relationship with the Fox family of Falmouth, as described by siblings Barclay and Caroline, who both kept journals which were published in the 1970s. Barclay Fox notes the brilliant lecture that Wightwick gave at the Polytechnic: "The Romance of Architecture" (entry: 3 October 1838); their companionship at the meeting of the British Association in Plymouth (entry: 29 July 1841); and his visit to the new Bodmin Lunatic Asylum with Wightwick (the architect) (entry: 23 August 1841). Caroline Fox describes Wightwick's witty tabletalk, when he dined at Penjerrick, the Fox family home (entries: 6 April 1839 and 25 October 1839); her attendance at a lecture he gave (entry: 18 January 1849); and news that he would move to Clifton (entry: 27 June 1851). Through this long period, Wightwick kept contact with this family of "opinion-formers" and powerful social networkers.

== Writings ==
His first work was Select Views of Roman Antiquities (1828). After his retirement from architectural practice, he continued his writing about architecture, both in the Bristol papers and the national professional press.

Books by "George Wightwick, Architect" held by the British Library (British Library Integrated catalogue search 11 June 2006)

- Nettleton’s Guide to Plymouth ... and to the neighbouring country, etc. (1836).
- Hints to Young Architects: comprising advice to those who are destined to follow the profession (1846, with new editions in 1847, 1860, 1875 and 1880).
- The Palace of Architecture: a romance of art and history [With plates.] (1840).
- Richard the First, a romantik play in five acts [in verse, with occasional scenes in prose] (1848).
- Henry the Second: a tragedy in five acts [in verse] (1851).
