= Carole Vincent =

English painter and sculptor

Carole Vincent (1939 – May 2019) was an English painter, sculptor and teacher. She created works by commission for public spaces, and is known for her sculptures in concrete, particularly "The Armada Dial" in Plymouth.

== Life ==
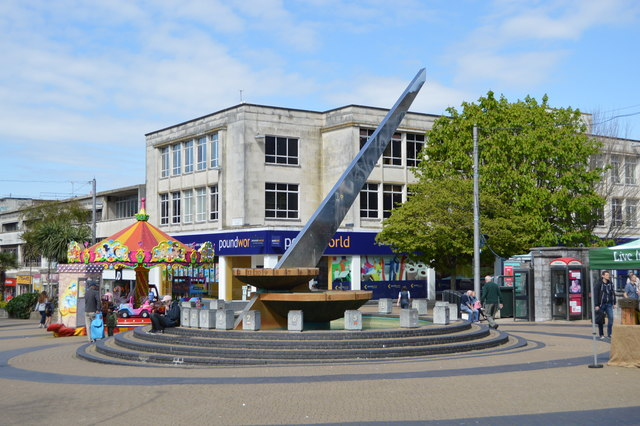
The Armada Dial, in Plymouth

Vincent studied at Bath Academy of Art, and Chelsea College of Physical Education, and from age 21 she lived in Cornwall. She taught for many years at Sir James Smith's School in Camelford. Her early work was in painting, and she later moved to sculpture.

From 1971 she was self-employed, and founded at her home in Boscastle "Half Acre", an artists' studio, garden and teaching location. She experimented with natural colour and texture in concrete for sculpture; in 2007 she became the first winner of the British Precast "Creativity in Concrete" award.

She was also a keen gardener, and her Blue Circle garden at Half Acre, which contains her sculptures, won a bronze medal at the Chelsea Flower Show in 2001.

== Works ==
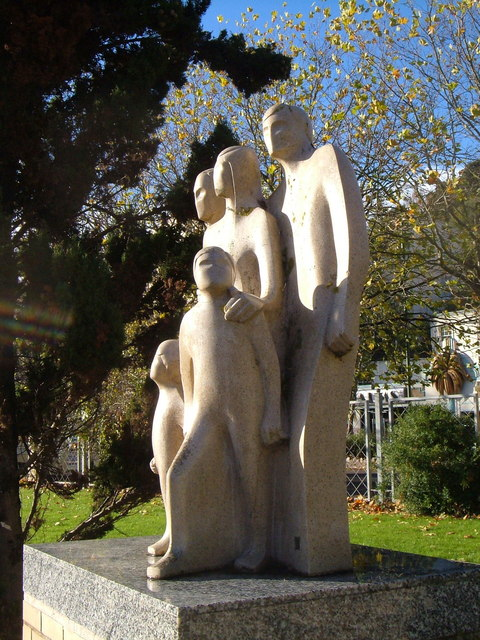
"The Year of the Pedestrian", in Torquay

Vincent's works include the following:

"The Armada Dial", a large sundial and fountain in Armada Way, Plymouth, was unveiled by Queen Elizabeth II on 22 July 1988. It was commissioned by Plymouth City Council to mark the "Armada 400" celebrations in the city. It is made of cast concrete with terrazzo, and stainless steel, and is 8.25 metres (27.1 ft) high. There are 24 granite plinths around the outside marked with numbers and with instructions for reading the sundial.

Four copies of "The Year of the Pedestrian" were commissioned by Devon County Council, to be placed in Barnstaple, Torbay, Plymouth and Exeter. They are made of polished concrete, and were unveiled in 1989.

"The Bude Light", designed by Vincent and Anthony Fanshawe, was commissioned by Bude-Stratton Town Council. It was unveiled in 2000 in Ergue Gaberic Way, Bude, Cornwall to celebrate the millennium, and to celebrate the invention of the Bude-Light in 1830 by Sir Goldsworthy Gurney.It is a slender conical structure made of coloured concrete, with a granite base; fibre optic lights on the cone create star constellations.

There are two sculptures by Vincent in St Helier, Jersey: "Les jongleurs" (1996) in Snow Hill and "La citadelle" (2004) in Ordnance Yard. They are owned by the Jersey Public Sculpture Trust, whose tenth anniversary was celebrated by "La citadelle".
