= Bude-Light =

Type of oil or gas light

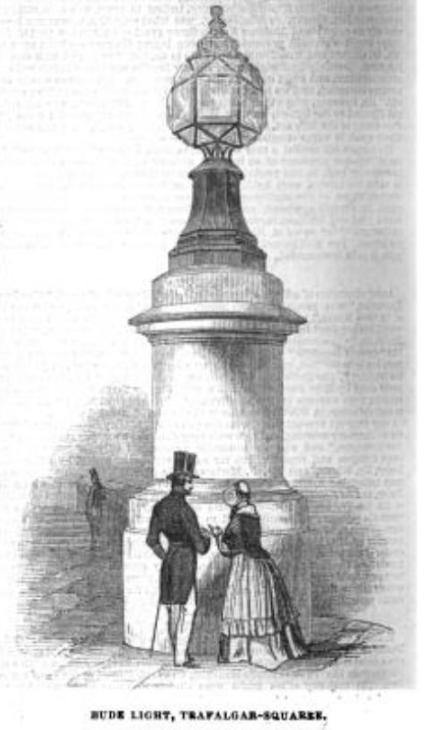
An artist's impression of one of the Bude Lights installed at Trafalgar Square, London, in 1845.

A Bude-Light was a very bright oil lamp (later, in its modified form, a gas lamp) invented by Sir Goldsworthy Gurney, patented by him on 8 June 1839 and named after Bude, Cornwall, where he lived.

== History ==
=== Lighthouse experiments ===
As first developed, the light worked by introducing pure oxygen into the centre of an Argand burner. It was claimed to be a cheap way of producing a bright light: the unburned carbon in the oil flame burned incredibly brightly and an intense, white light was produced from the weak yellow flame of the oil lamp. In 1838, Gurney reported the results of his initial tests to Michael Faraday, who recommended the proposal to Trinity House for possible use in lighthouses. It was trialled on an experimental basis in Orford Low Lighthouse in 1839, where its flame was observed to be 2.5 times as powerful as a flame of the same size on a conventional oil lamp; its use in lighthouses was not pursued, however, due to high running costs.

=== Houses of Parliament ===
The chair of the parliamentary lighthouse committee, however, Joseph Hume, was involved in the reconstruction of the Palace of Westminster at the time and saw a potential opportunity for their use there. In May 1839, he presented his lamp to a select committee of the House of Commons; subsequently their use was trialled in the temporary Chamber of the House of Commons (at the time the Chamber was unsatisfactorily lit by large numbers of 15-inch candles, earlier experiments with both Argand lamps and gas lighting having thus far failed).

Gurney had claimed (and already demonstrated) that his Bude-Lamp would cost the same to manufacture as a similarly-sized Argand lamp, and yet would produce a light more than twice as powerful while burning a quarter as much oil. There were setbacks during the trials, however: it proved difficult to trim the wicks satisfactorily, without interrupting debates, and managing the flexible tubes which provided the oxygen feed further complicated this procedure. Moreover, obtaining pure oxygen (which Gurney had sought to source from Manganese being mined in Devon and Cornwall) proved to be less straightforward and much more expensive than first thought.

He therefore began to modify his design, convinced that, by doing so, he would be able to create an 'Atmospheric' Bude-Lamp: by substituting air for oxygen with little detrimental effect. To eliminate the need for maintaining a wick, he explored using coal gas in place of oil. He purified the gas, and impregnated it with vapours of naphtha, turpentine and India rubber; this was then fed through a set of concentric burners designed 'to communicate by conduction and radiation sufficient heat to raise the temperature of the gas to a given point, so as to effect the separation of its charcoal immediately on its leaving the burner, and then […] to bring fresh atmospheric air to the proper points of the flame'. The chemical changes brought about by this precision mechanical arrangement achieved 'an effulgence adequate to every purpose of internal and external illumination'. Self-regulating Atmospheric Bude-Lamps (enclosed in airtight glass containers, with eduction tubes to remove the fumes and heat) were soon successfully installed in the temporary Commons chamber (and operated 'at a cost of only twelve shillings per night, whereas that of the candles previously used there amounted to six pounds eleven shillings per night'); and indeed their use was promptly extended to the parliamentary libraries, lobbies and one of the committee rooms. Gurney went on to market the lamps for use in churches, public buildings, private residences and shops.

Despite his pioneering work in Parliament, however, responsibility for lighting the rebuilt Palace of Westminster was instead divided (for an experimental period) between arch-rivals Sir Charles Barry and Dr David Reid; both their systems proved unsatisfactory, however, and in 1853 Gurney's system was installed. Its effectiveness was proved, to the satisfaction of both the Lords and the Commons, and the following year Gurney was placed in sole charge, not only of the lighting but also of heating and ventilating the entire building. His Bude-Light system stayed in use in the Houses of Parliament for over 50 years.

=== Trafalgar Square ===
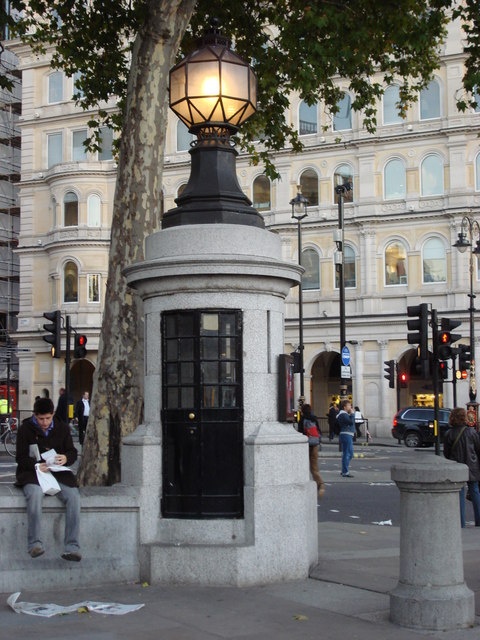
Bude Light in the south-east corner of Trafalgar Square, now lit by electricity. The lamp's granite column has been converted into a police post, sometimes described as "London's smallest police station".

Four Bude Lights, with octagonal glass lanterns, were installed in Trafalgar Square in London in around 1845. They were at some point converted to electricity, and are still in use. Two, across from the National Gallery, are on tall cast bronze columns, and two, in the south-west and south-east corners of the square, on short cast bronze columns on top of wider granite columns. (Note: Trafalgar Square, north-west: 51.508275°N 0.128734°W; Trafalgar Square, north-east: 51.508455°N 0.127639°W; Trafalgar Square, south-east: 51.507933°N 0.127240°W; Trafalgar Square, south-west: 51.507707°N 0.128655°W) They were made by Messrs. Stevens and Son, of the Darlington Works, Southwark, to designs by Charles Barry.

== Commemoration ==
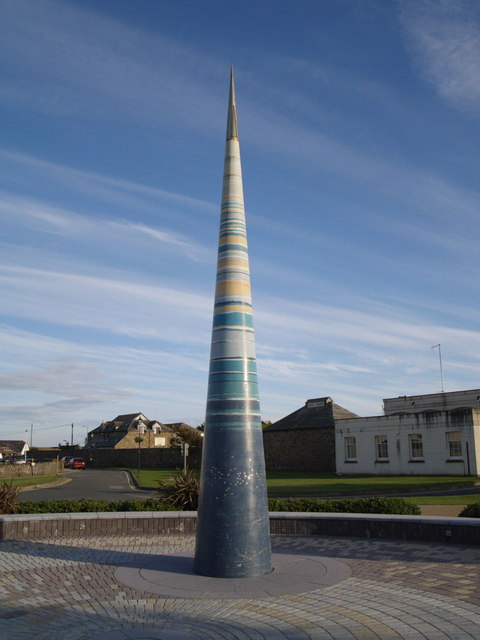
Bude Light 2000

In the seaside resort town of Bude a commemorative installation, also referred to as the Bude Light, was erected to mark the millennium and remember the Bude Lights' inventor, Goldsworthy Gurney. It was designed by artist Carole Vincent and Anthony Fanshawe. Apart from a light at its apex, it is lit internally with fibre-optics displaying star constellations, and has a small seating area positioned around the light.
