= Lynstone =

Hamlet in north Cornwall, England

Coordinates: 50°49′15″N 4°32′55″W

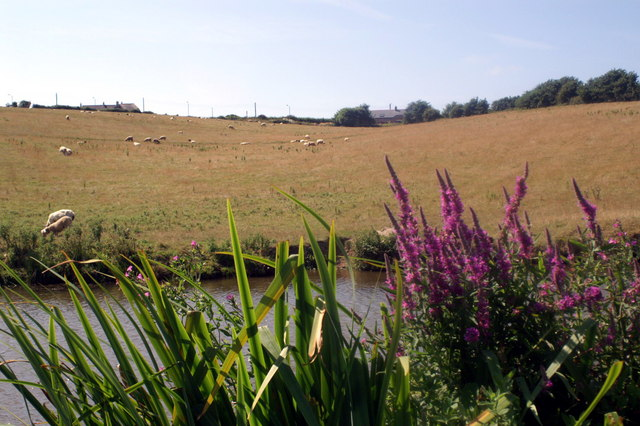
Lynstone from the Bude Canal

Lynstone is a hamlet near Bude in north Cornwall, England. At the 2011 census the population at the 2011 census was included in the civil parish of Bude-Stratton.
