= Bush, Cornwall =

Hamlet in Cornwall, England

Coordinates: 50°50′29″N 4°30′39″W

Bush: Cornish: Prysk
- Hamlet
- Location within Cornwall
- Unitary authority: Cornwall
- Region: South West
- Country: England
- Sovereign state: United Kingdom
- Police: Devon and Cornwall
- Fire: Cornwall
- Ambulance: South Western

Bush (Cornish: Prysk) is a hamlet in the parish of Bude-Stratton, Cornwall, England, UK (where the 2011 census population is included).
