= Flexbury =

Village in Cornwall, England

Coordinates: 50.835592°N 4.5412077°W

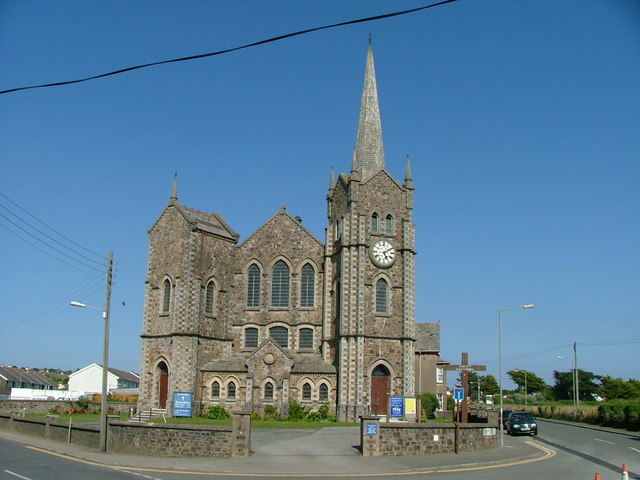

- Location within Cornwall
- Area: 0.700 km^{2} (0.270 sq mi)
- Population: 2,290 (2018 estimate)
  - Density: 3,271/km^{2} (8,470/sq mi)
- Civil parish: Bude–Stratton
- Unitary authority: Cornwall
- Ceremonial county: Cornwall
- Region: South West
- Country: England
- Sovereign state: United Kingdom
- Police: Devon and Cornwall
- Fire: Cornwall
- Ambulance: South Western

Flexbury is a village about 0.8 miles from Bude, in the civil parish of Bude–Stratton, north Cornwall, England. Described as a hamlet in 1887, residential properties have since been built to the coast at Crooklets beach. In 2018 it had an estimated population of 2290.

== History ==
The name "Flexbury" may mean "Felix’s earthwork". In 1887 it was described as a ″hamlet and seat, near Bude Haven″. Flexbury Park Methodist Church, opened in 1905 and is a grade II listed building. The church closed in 2008 and is now a residential property.

Flexbury has a history of flooding which was addressed by the Flexbury flood alleviation scheme.
