= Bude =

Town in Cornwall, England

Coordinates: 50.824°N 4.542°W

Bude: Cornish: Porthbud
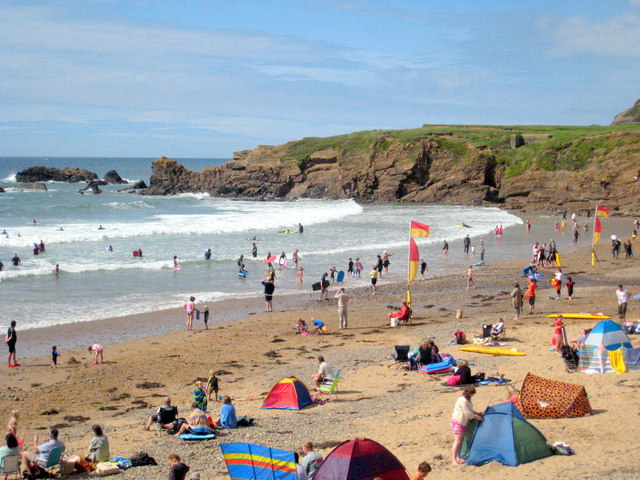

- Location within Cornwall
- Population: 7,350 (Built up area, 2021)
- OS grid reference: SS215065
- Civil parish: Bude-Stratton
- Unitary authority: Cornwall
- Ceremonial county: Cornwall
- Region: South West
- Country: England
- Sovereign state: United Kingdom
- Post town: BUDE
- Postcode district: EX23
- Dialling code: 01288
- Police: Devon and Cornwall
- Fire: Cornwall
- Ambulance: South Western
- UK Parliament: North Cornwall
- Website: www.visitbude.info www.bude-stratton.gov.uk/

Bude (/bjuːd/, locally /buːd/ or /bɛwd/; Cornish Standard Written Form: Porthbud [pɔɹθbyːd]) is a seaside town in north Cornwall, England, in the civil parish of Bude-Stratton and at the mouth of the River Neet (also known locally as the River Strat). It was sometimes formerly known as Bude Haven.

It lies southwest of Stratton, south of Flexbury and Poughill, and north of Widemouth Bay, located along the A3073 road off the A39. Bude is twinned with Ergué-Gabéric in Brittany, France. Bude's coast faces Bude Bay in the Celtic Sea, part of the Atlantic Ocean. At the 2021 census, the built-up area as defined by the Office of National Statistics had a population of 7,350.

Its earlier importance was as a harbour, and then a source of sea sand useful for improving the inland soil. This was transported on the Bude Canal. The Victorians favoured it as a seaside resort. With new rail links, it became a popular seaside destination in the 20th century. Bradshaw's Guide of 1866, Section 2, described Bude as "a small port and picturesque village in the north-eastern extremity of Cornwall". It described the town as having the dignity of a fashionable marine resort with excellent facilities for bathers. The harbour bed consists of fine bright yellow sand consisting of small shells. "The sea view is of a striking, bold and sublime description – the rocks rising on every side to lofty broken elevations." It also describes Bude as a romantic retreat.

== Geography ==
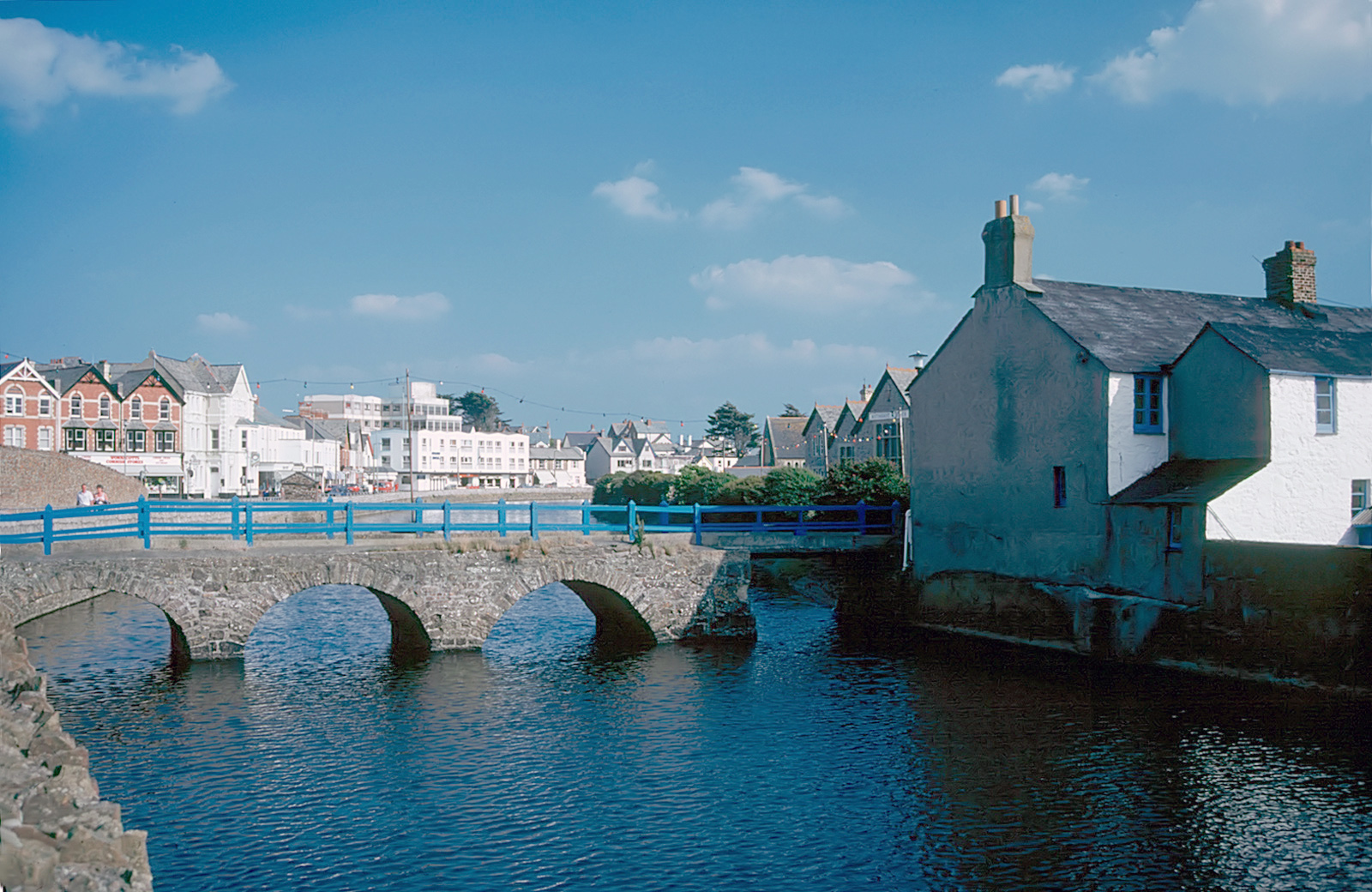
Townscape

Bude lies just west of Stratton and north of Widemouth Bay and is located along the A3073 road off the A39 road. The section of the A39 running through Bude is known as the Atlantic Highway.

=== Coastline ===
A section of Bude's coast, between Compass Cove to the south and Furzey Cove to the north, is a SSSI (Site of Special Scientific Interest) noted for its geological and biological interest. Part of the land designated as the Bude Coast Site of Special Scientific Interest is owned by the National Trust. Carboniferous sandstone cliffs surround Bude. During the Variscan Orogeny the strata were heavily faulted and folded. As the sands and cliffs around Bude contain calcium carbonate (a natural fertiliser), farmers used to take sand from the beach, for spreading on their fields. The cliffs around Bude are the only ones in Cornwall that are made of Carboniferous sandstone, as most of the Cornish coast is formed of Devonian slate, granite and Precambrian metamorphic rocks. The stratified cliffs of Bude give their name to a sequence of rocks called the Bude Formation. Many formations can be viewed from the South West Coast Path which passes through the town.

Many ships have been wrecked on the jagged reefs which fringe the base of the cliffs. The figurehead of one of these, the Bencoolen, a barque whose wrecking in 1862 resulted in the drowning of most of the crew, was preserved in the churchyard but was transferred to the town museum to save it from further decay. The aftermath of the wreck of the Bencoolen was described by Robert Stephen Hawker in letters which were published in Hawker's Poetical Works (1879).

=== Climate ===
Like the rest of the British Isles and South West England, Bude experiences a maritime climate with cool summers and mild winters. Temperature extremes at the Met Office weather station at Bude range from −11.1 °C (12.0 °F) during February 1969 to 36.0 °C (96.8 °F) in July 2022. The Met Office recorded Bude as the sunniest place in the United Kingdom during the summer of 2013 with 783 hours of sunlight.

Climate data for Bude (1991–2020 normals, extremes 1913–present)
Month	Jan	Feb	Mar	Apr	May	Jun	Jul	Aug	Sep	Oct	Nov	Dec	Year
Record high °C (°F)	15.6 (60.1)	17.8 (64.0)	23.4 (74.1)	26.1 (79.0)	31.2 (88.2)	33.4 (92.1)	36.0 (96.8)	34.3 (93.7)	29.4 (84.9)	25.4 (77.7)	18.2 (64.8)	17.2 (63.0)	36.0 (96.8)
Mean daily maximum °C (°F)	9.4 (48.9)	9.4 (48.9)	10.8 (51.4)	12.8 (55.0)	15.5 (59.9)	17.7 (63.9)	19.3 (66.7)	19.4 (66.9)	18.1 (64.6)	15.2 (59.4)	12.3 (54.1)	10.1 (50.2)	14.2 (57.6)
Daily mean °C (°F)	6.8 (44.2)	6.7 (44.1)	7.7 (45.9)	9.3 (48.7)	12.0 (53.6)	14.4 (57.9)	16.2 (61.2)	16.4 (61.5)	14.8 (58.6)	12.2 (54.0)	9.5 (49.1)	7.4 (45.3)	11.1 (52.0)
Mean daily minimum °C (°F)	4.3 (39.7)	3.9 (39.0)	4.7 (40.5)	5.9 (42.6)	8.5 (47.3)	11.1 (52.0)	13.2 (55.8)	13.4 (56.1)	11.5 (52.7)	9.3 (48.7)	6.6 (43.9)	4.7 (40.5)	8.1 (46.6)
Record low °C (°F)	−10.6 (12.9)	−11.1 (12.0)	−7.8 (18.0)	−3.8 (25.2)	−2.2 (28.0)	1.1 (34.0)	3.9 (39.0)	3.9 (39.0)	0.6 (33.1)	−3.4 (25.9)	−6.1 (21.0)	−8.9 (16.0)	−11.1 (12.0)
Average precipitation mm (inches)	91.0 (3.58)	73.3 (2.89)	57.9 (2.28)	53.3 (2.10)	52.4 (2.06)	59.4 (2.34)	71.0 (2.80)	77.7 (3.06)	65.4 (2.57)	97.8 (3.85)	104.0 (4.09)	102.4 (4.03)	905.7 (35.66)
Average precipitation days (≥ 1.0 mm)	15.2	12.5	11.9	10.2	9.8	10.3	10.9	12.3	11.1	15.0	17.2	16.4	152.8
Mean monthly sunshine hours	61.3	87.7	129.6	185.8	220.8	208.2	198.8	187.1	160.8	114.1	69.2	55.5	1,679
Source 1: Met Office
Source 2: Starlings Roost Weather

== History and description ==
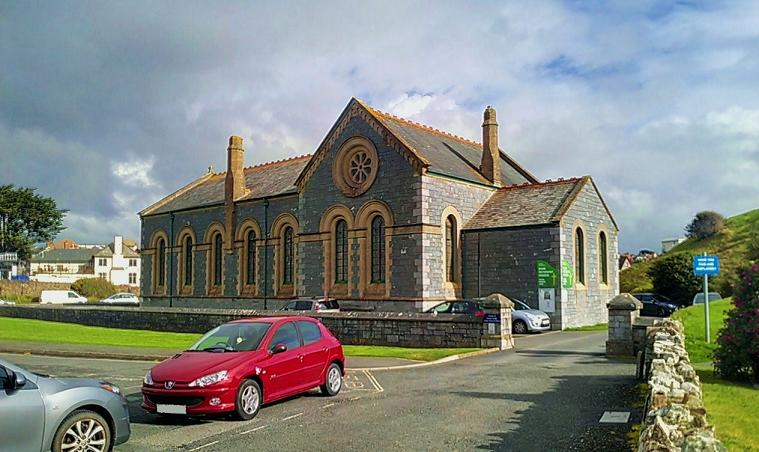
Bude Methodist Church

Bude-Stratton is said to have been a settlement since the Bronze Age but nothing remains of it.

Efford Manor, seat of the Arundell family of Trerice, was the only building here in the Middle Ages. Bude or Porthbud was known as Bede's Haven, the 'chapel' or 'hermitage' on the rock, Bede being the holy man who lived there, on what is now the breakwater. The original breakwater was destroyed in 1838 by a terrible storm, while the newer version was constructed in 1839. The spectacular sandstone coast here is a Site of Specific Scientific Interest, known for jagged reefs, implicated in many past shipwrecks. Alongside the sea and by the canal runs the river Neet (or Strat). The two halves of the town are connected by Nanny Moore's bridge, a grade two listed building, named after a 19th-century ‘dipper’ who lived nearby. Beyond this lay the quay, rebuilt in 1577 with funds from the Blanchminster charity.

The river divided the land owned by two Cornish families. South of the river was owned by Sir John Arundell, while land to the north was owned by Sir Richard Grenville of Stowe Barton, Kilkhampton. During the 1700-1800s, Bude was a thriving port used by smaller vessels. Over time, the land changed hands – the Grenville land passed to the Carterets/Thynnes while the Arundell land passed to the Aclands. Bude and neighbouring Stratton are relevant in the English Civil War, with Nanny Moore's Bridge featuring as a passage over the river for the Royalists.

=== Victorian resort ===
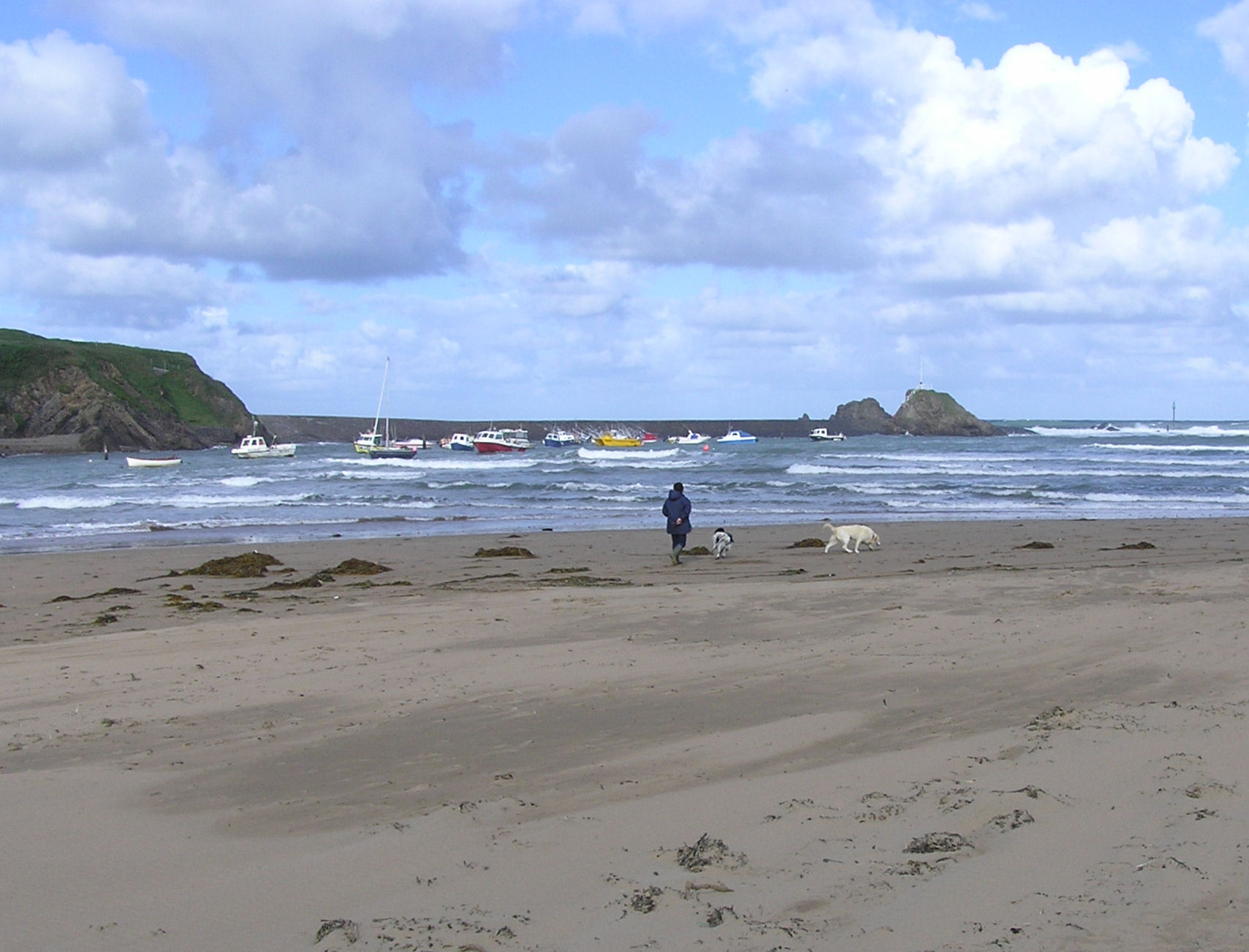
The Haven, the Atlantic Ocean and the beach at Bude

Bude became popular in Victorian times for sea bathing, inspired by the Romantic movement. The ladies used Crooklets Beach while the gentlemen were segregated to Summerleaze. Workers flocked to Bude for the building of the canal, but as shipping dwindled, and the railway reached dominance, Bude concentrated on the emergent tourist trade. By 1926, there were 59 boarding houses and 5 hotels: the Falcon, Grenville, Globe, Norfolk and the Commercial.

== Landmarks and attractions ==
=== Beaches ===
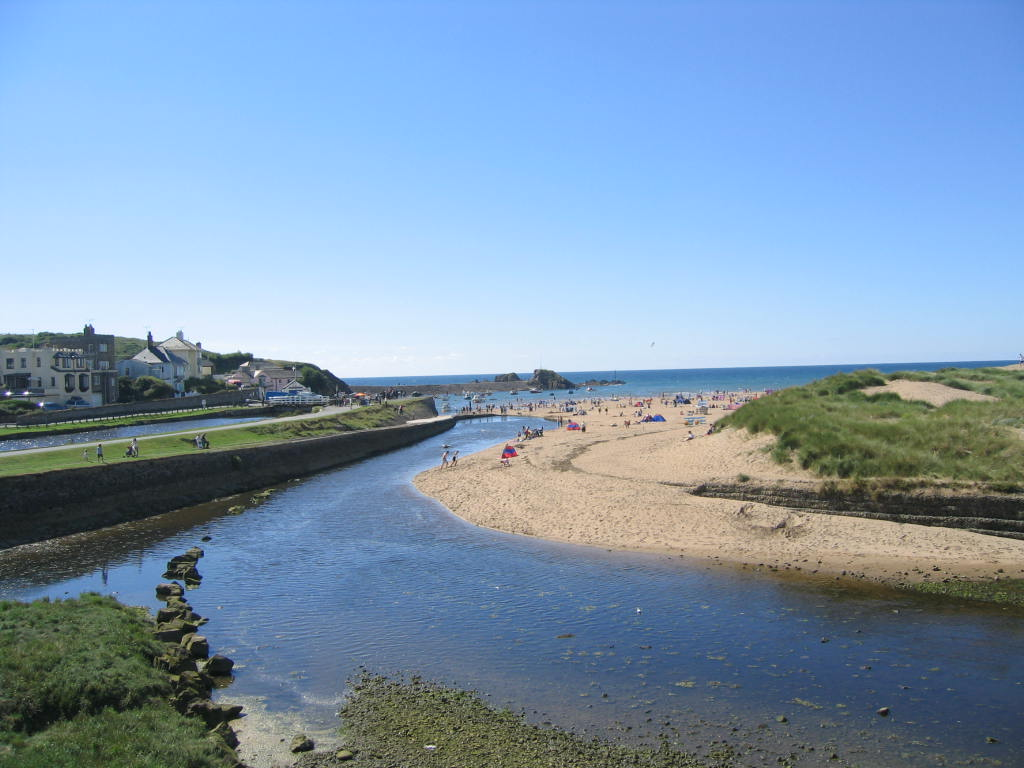
View of the beach in Bude and the canal coming to an end as it reaches the sea lock (on left of image)

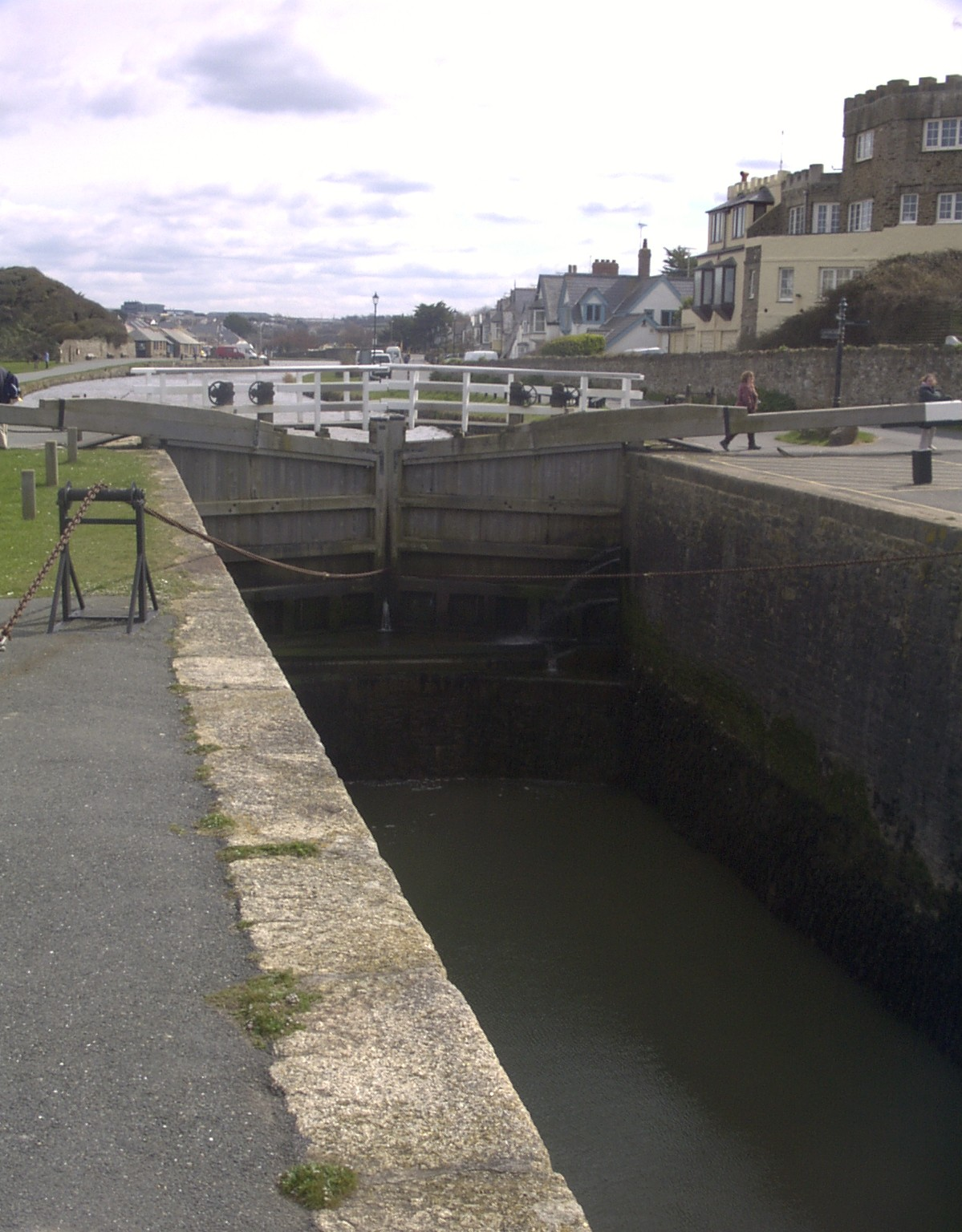
The sea lock on Bude Canal

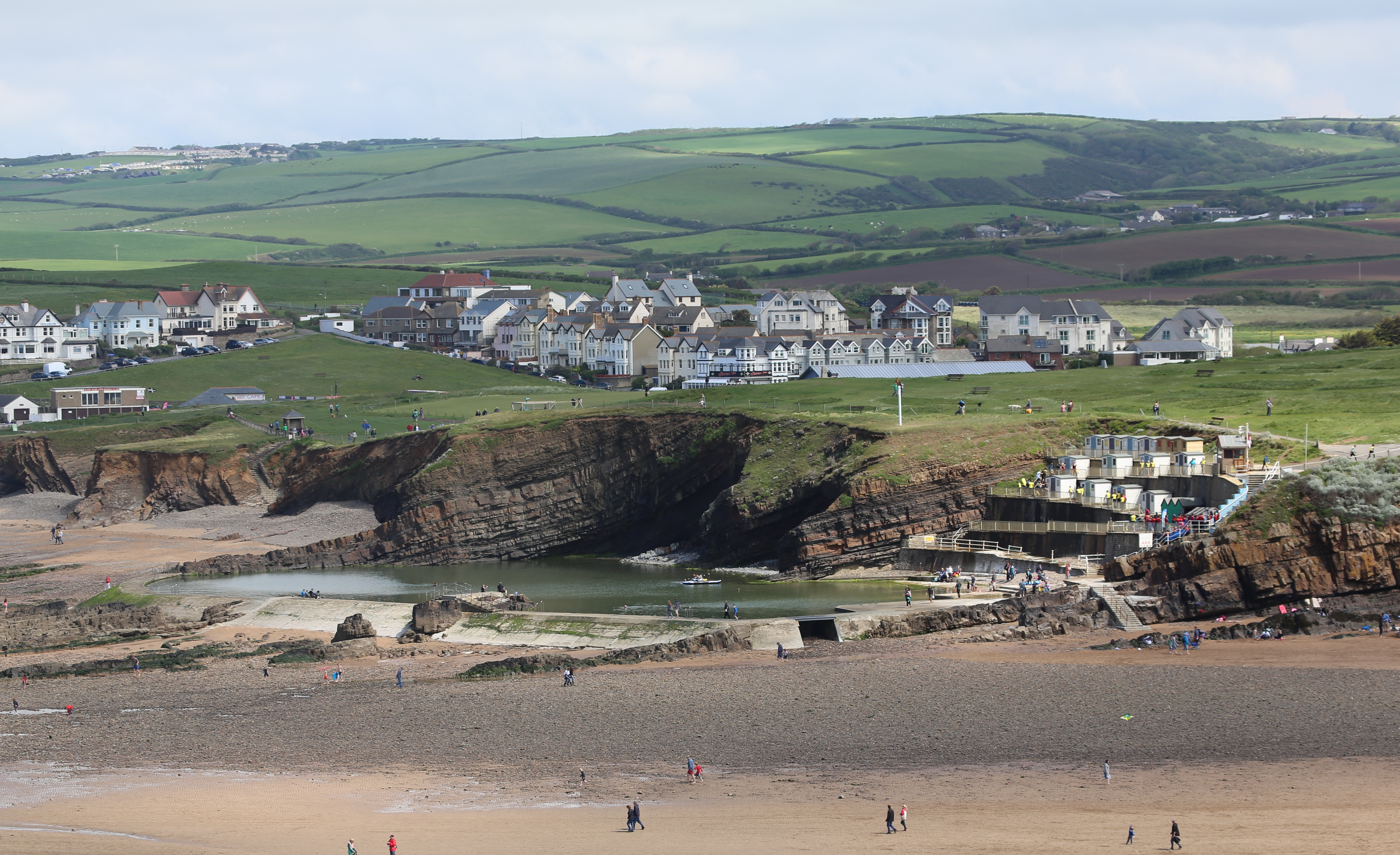
Bude Sea Pool

There are a number of good beaches in the Bude area, many of which offer good surfing conditions and many of which are dog-friendly. Bude Lifeboat Station is at Summerleaze beach. Established in 1954, Bude was the founder club in British Surf Life Saving.

- Summerleaze, Crooklets and 'middle' beach, are all within the town;
- Widemouth Bay is a few miles south of the town and offers a long, wide sandy beach;
- Sandymouth Beach is owned by the National Trust, and has spectacular cliffs and rock formations with shingle below the cliffs and a large expanse of sand at low tide. There are also a number of other coves and beaches to be found and explored in the local area.

=== Bude Harbour and Canal ===
In the 18th century there was a small unprotected tidal harbour at Bude. The Bude Canal Company built a canal and improved the harbour. Around twenty small boats use the tidal moorings of the original harbour during the summer months. Most are sport fishermen, but there is also some small-scale, semi-commercial, fishing for crab and lobster.

There is a wharf on the Bude Canal about half a mile from the sea lock that links the canal to the tidal haven. This can be opened only at or near high tide, and then only when sea conditions allow. North Cornwall District Council administered the canal, harbour and lock gates until its abolition in March 2009. These gates were renewed after the originals were damaged in a storm in 2008. They are the only manually operated sea lock gates in England. The pier head by the locks is a Grade II listed structure.

The canal is one of the few of note in southwest England. Its original purpose was to take small tub boats of mineral-rich sand from the beaches at Bude and carry them inland for agricultural use on fields. A series of inclined planes carried the boats over 400 vertical feet (120 m) to Red Post, where the canal branched south along the upper Tamar Valley towards Launceston east to Holsworthy and north to the Tamar Lakes, that fed the canal. The enterprise was always in financial difficulty, but it carried considerable volumes of sand and also coal from south Wales.

The arrival of the railway at Holsworthy and the production of cheap manufactured fertiliser undermined the canal's commercial purpose, and it was closed down and sold to the district municipal water company. However the wharf area and harbour enjoyed longer success, and coastal sailing ships carried grain across to Wales and coal back to Cornwall.

=== Notable buildings ===
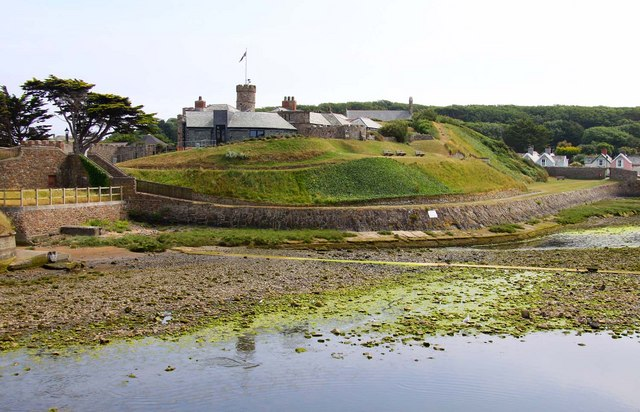
Bude Castle

Notable buildings include the parish church of St Michael and All Angels, built in 1835 and enlarged in 1876 (the architect was George Wightwick), Ebbingford Manor, and the town's oldest house, Quay Cottage in the centre of town. Bude Castle was built about 1830 on sand on a concrete raft for Victorian inventor Sir Goldsworthy Gurney and is now a heritage centre. Gurney also invented the Bude-Light.

==== Bude sculpture ====
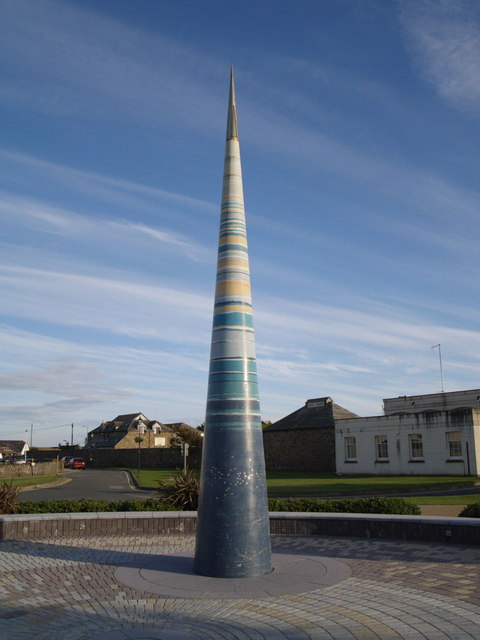
Bude Light 2000

A conical installation, also referred to as the 'Bude Light', was opened in June 2000 near Bude Castle to mark the millennium and to remember Goldsworthy Gurney, the Bude-Lights' inventor. It was designed by artist Carole Vincent and Anthony Fanshawe. It has a light at its apex, and is also lit internally with fibre-optics displaying star constellations.

At the northernmost point of Efford Down Farm, overlooking Summerleaze Beach and the breakwater, a former coastguard lookout stands. Known as Compass Point and built by the Acland family in 1840 of local sandstone, it is based on the Temple of Winds in Athens. It was moved to its current position in 1880 and again in 2023 to protect it from collapse due to cliff erosion. It is so called as it has points of the compass carved in each of its octagonal sides.

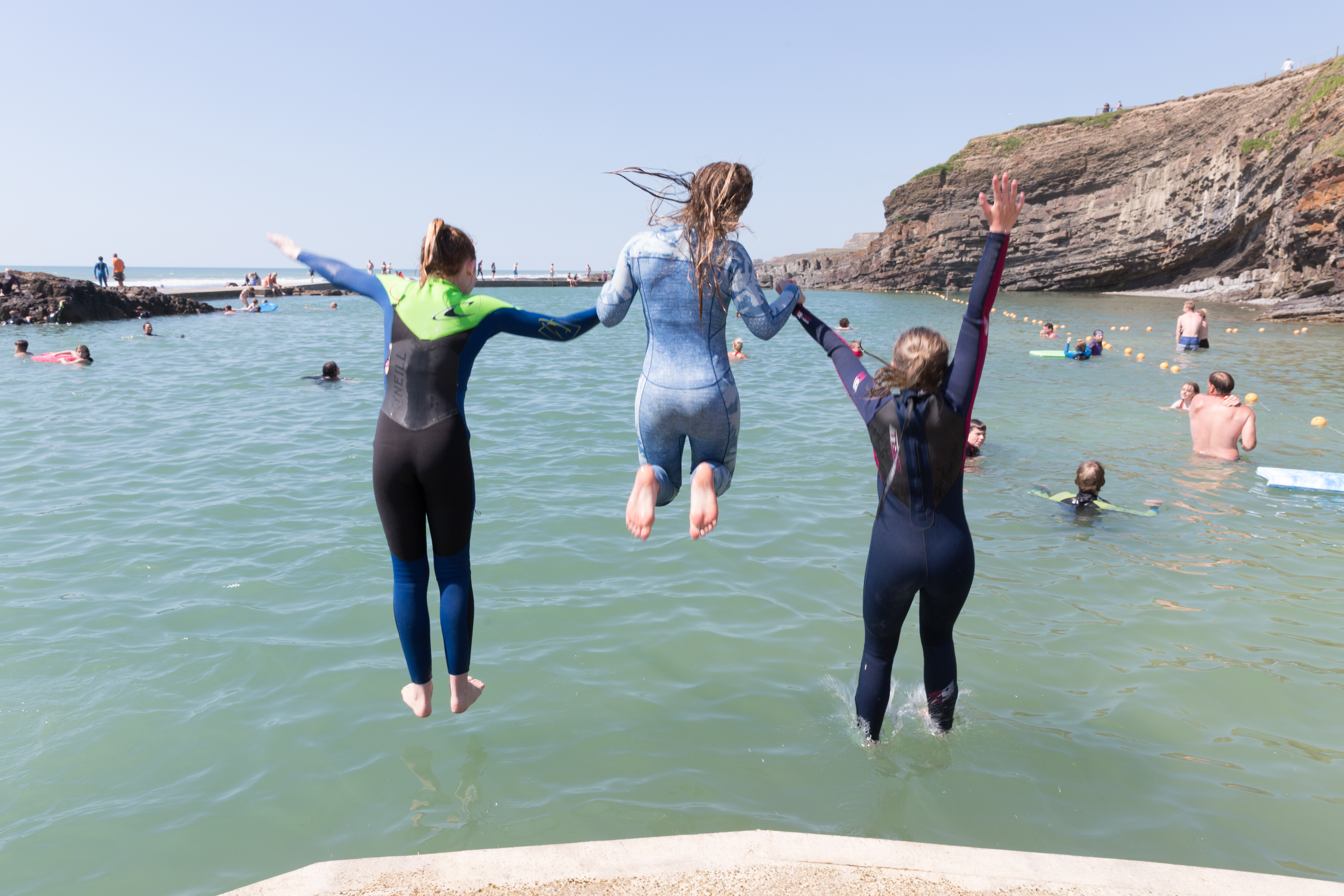
Bude Sea Pool diving event

In 1953, Bude became home to the first Surf Life Saving Club in the UK, while the popular lido Bude Sea Pool opened in 1930. This was previously administered by Cornwall Council but lost public funding in 2010/11. The Friends of Bude Sea Pool was created in 2011 to secure its future.

==== Bude Tunnel ====
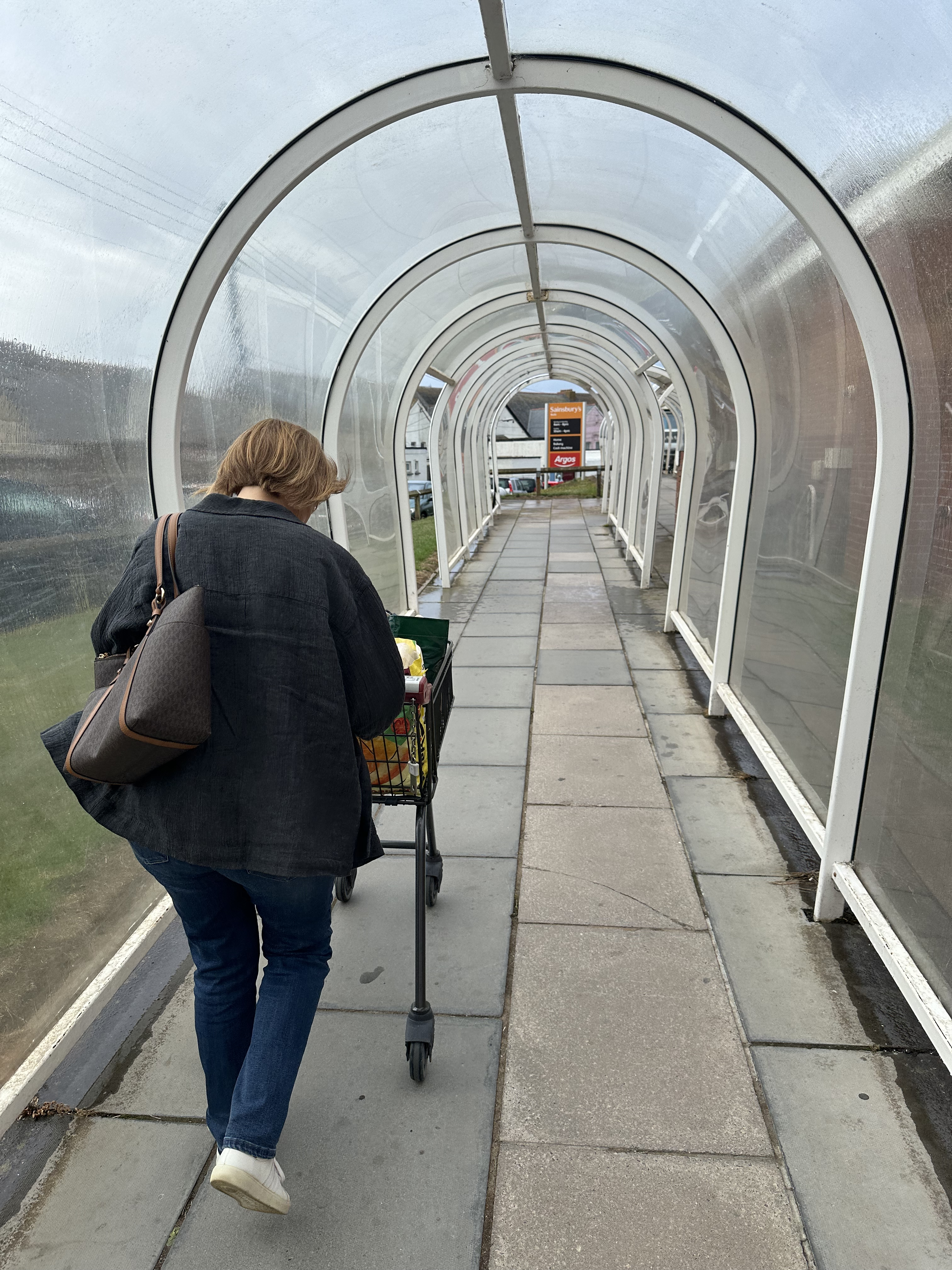
Interior of the "Bude Tunnel" in 2023

In September 2018, the "Bude Tunnel", a 70-metre (80-yard) perspex walkway at the Bude Sainsbury's supermarket site, was mentioned in the national press after becoming the town's top-rated attraction on TripAdvisor. Reviews facetiously compared the tunnel to the Taj Mahal, Hanging Gardens of Babylon and Great Sphinx of Giza.

The popularity caused TripAdvisor to temporarily suspend all reviews for the Bude Tunnel, citing a number of reviews that "do not describe a first-hand experience". The tunnel continued to be the top attraction for at least four months after the suspension. In December of that year, the tunnel was covered in Christmas lights. Reviews of the tunnel were reinstated by the website in October 2023, causing another influx of positive reviews.

==== Gorsedh Kernow ====
In 2021, Bude hosted the Gorsedh Kernow (a festival of Cornish culture and bardic ceremony) as it did in 1961, 1975, and 1993. The festival was scheduled to take place in 2020, but was postponed due to the COVID-19 pandemic.

== Media ==
Local TV coverage is provided by BBC South West and ITV West Country. Television signals are received from the Caradon Hill TV transmitter.

Local radio stations are BBC Radio Cornwall on 95.2 FM, Heart West on 105.1 FM, Greatest Hits Radio on 102.2 FM and Piran Radio, a community based radio station which broadcasts online.

Bude developed its own newspaper in 1924, The Bude and Stratton Post.

Progressive rock band King Crimson wrote a song dedicated to the town and included it as the first track on their EP Happy with What You Have to Be Happy With.

== Transport ==
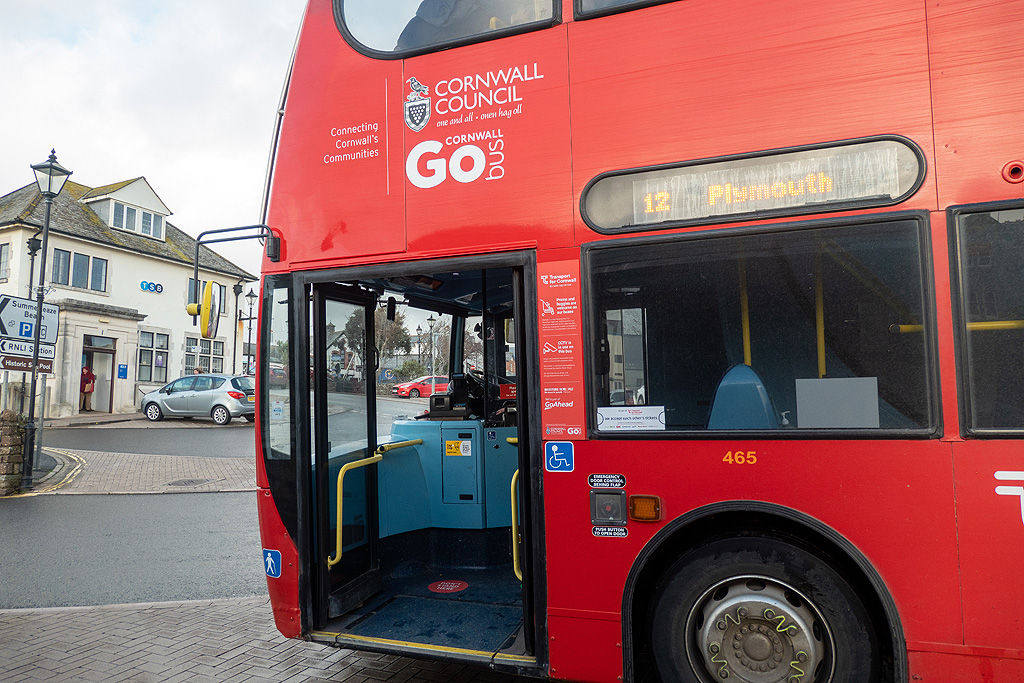
Go Cornwall Bus in Bude preparing to leave for Plymouth

=== Buses ===
Buses are run by Stagecoach South West and Go Cornwall Bus. Services run to surrounding towns and villages in Devon and Cornwall.

=== Railway ===
From 1879, Bude's nearest railway station was at Holsworthy, ten miles away. The railway came to Bude itself in 1898. The line was built by the London & South Western Railway, incorporated into the Southern Railway in 1923 and British Railways in 1948. Bude railway station was served by the Atlantic Coast Express, providing a direct service to/from London Waterloo, until it was discontinued in 1964. Bude station and the entire Bude branch line closed on 1 October 1966 as part of the Beeching cuts. Bude and neighbouring Stratton are further from the rail network than any other towns in England. Okehampton (29 miles (47 km)), Barnstaple (35 miles (56 km) north east), Bodmin Parkway (32 miles (51 km) south) and Gunnislake (32 miles (51 km) south east) are the nearest National Rail stations with regular services.

== Industry ==
Tourism is the main industry in the Bude area whilst some fishing is carried on. In the past, the staple trade was the export of sand, which, being highly charged with calcium carbonate, was much used as fertiliser. There are also golf links in the town.

The Bude area is also a telecommunications hub, with major subsea cables landing at nearby Widemouth Bay. The eavesdropping facility known as GCHQ Bude is just north of the town in Morwenstow. It is the largest employer in the area, with over 250 civil servants and contractors employed there.

== Governance ==
There are two tiers of local government covering Bude, at parish (town) and unitary authority level: Bude–Stratton Town Council and Cornwall Council. The town council is based at the Parkhouse Centre in Bude.

Bude is in the North Cornwall parliamentary constituency which is represented by Ben Maguire MP.

=== Administrative history ===
Bude historically formed part of the ancient parish of Stratton. When district councils were established in 1894, the parish of Stratton was included in the Stratton Rural District. In 1900 a new urban district called "Stratton and Bude" was created from most of the parish of Stratton, including both its main settlements of Bude and Stratton, as well as the Flexbury area from the parish of Poughill. Stratton and Bude Urban District Council therefore took over district-level functions within its area from Stratton Rural District Council.

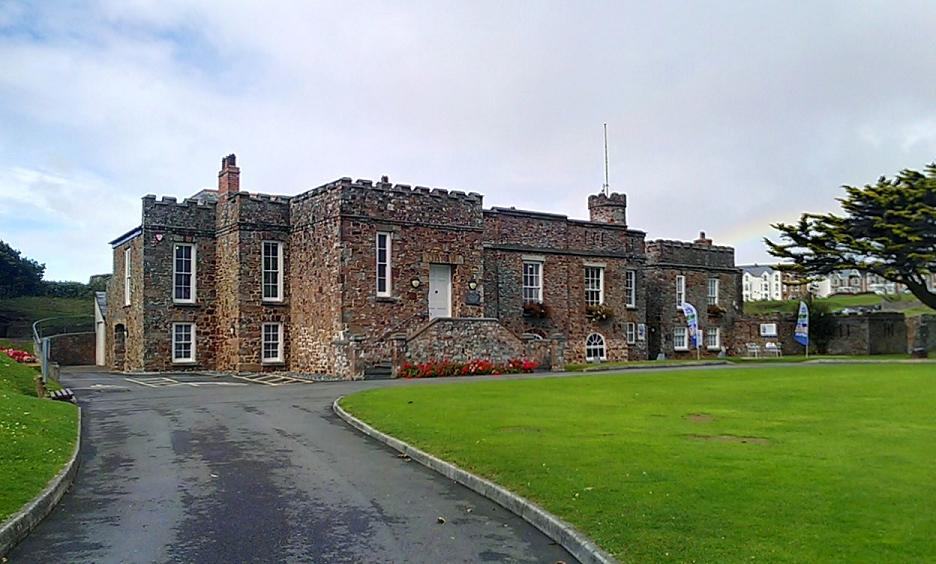
Bude Castle

In 1934 the urban district was enlarged to take in the residual rural parts of Stratton parish and the rest of Poughill parish, including the village. At the same time, the urban district's name was changed from "Stratton and Bude" to "Bude–Stratton". In 1947, Bude–Stratton Urban District Council bought Bude Castle (built 1830) to serve as its headquarters.

Bude–Stratton Urban District was abolished in 1974 under the Local Government Act 1972, with district-level functions passing to the new North Cornwall District Council. A successor parish called Bude–Stratton was created at the same time covering the area of the abolished urban district, with its parish council taking the name Bude–Stratton Town Council. North Cornwall was in turn abolished in 2009. Cornwall County Council then took on district-level functions, making it a unitary authority, and was renamed Cornwall Council.

== Sport ==
The town is home to a number of sports teams including Bude RFC – the town's rugby club, and Bude Town – the local football club. Bude is the host town of the North Cornwall Cup, a large youth football event held every August. Bude & North Cornwall Golf Club is ideally situated within the town centre. Bude is also home to the Bude Cricket Club.

=== Cornish wrestling ===
There have been Cornish wrestling tournaments, for prizes, in Bude for at least a couple of centuries. Venues for tournaments included: the Castle grounds, Broadclose Hill and the Football ground.

See also Cornish wrestling in Poughill.

== Notable residents ==
- Hannah Maynard (1834–1918), a Canadian photographer, best known for her portrait work and experimental photography involving photomontage and multiple exposures.
- Pamela Colman Smith (1878–1951), artist, illustrator, and writer, best known for designing the Rider-Waite-Smith deck of divinatory tarot cards for Arthur Edward Waite, lived and died in Bude.
- Archie Jewell (1888–1917), sailor, survived the sinking of the Titanic and its sister ship HMHS Britannic
- Jean Rhys (1890–1979), writer, lived in Bude in the 1950s and where she began her most successful novel, Wide Sargasso Sea
- George Mills (1896–1972), author of children's books, and his step-brother Arthur F. H. Mills (1887–1955), the crime and adventure novelist. Their grandfather Arthur Mills (1816–1898), an MP, lived nearby at Efford Down House.
- Sir Dudley Stamp (1898–1966), a leading British geographer; in his retirement he lived in Bude
- Sir Henry Gurney (1898–1951), a colonial administrator, high commissioner in Malaya, killed during the Malayan Emergency.
- Rennie Montague Bere (1907–1991), a British mountaineer, naturalist and nature conservationist. in his retirement, he lived in a nearby cottage, among his books are The Book of Bude and Stratton and The Nature of Cornwall.
- Vice-Admiral Sir Louis Le Bailly (1915– 2010), a Royal Navy officer who became director-general of intelligence
- Phil Diamond (born 1958), studied Astrophysical masers, director of the Jodrell Bank Centre for Astrophysics, 2006 to 2010.
- Tori Amos (born 1963), American singer-songwriter and pianist, has a home and studio in Bude.
