= Goldsworthy Gurney =

English surgeon, chemist, and architect (1793–1875)

Sir Goldsworthy Gurney
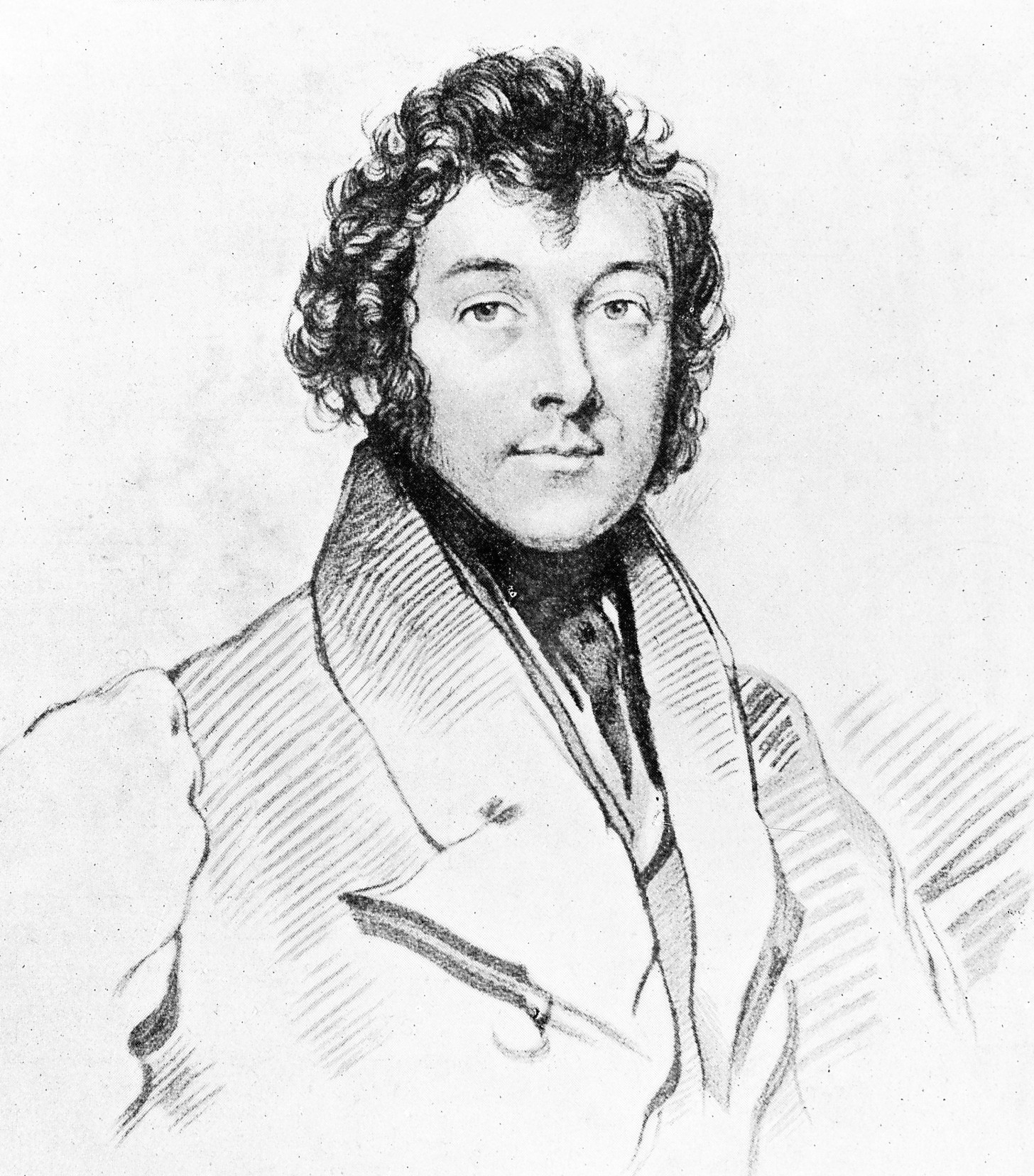
- Goldsworthy Gurney c.1827
- Born: 14 February 1793; St Merryn, Cornwall, England
- Died: 28 February 1875 (aged 82); Reeds, Poughill, Cornwall
- Occupations: Surgeon, chemist, lecturer, consultant, architect, builder, gentleman scientist, inventor

Sir Goldsworthy Gurney (14 February 1793 – 28 February 1875) was a British surgeon, chemist, architect, builder, lecturer and consultant. He was a prototypical British gentleman scientist and inventor of the Victorian era.

Amongst many accomplishments, he developed the oxy-hydrogen blowpipe, and later applied its principles to a novel form of illumination, the Bude-Light; developed a series of early steam-powered road vehicles; and laid claim—still discussed and disputed today—to the blastpipe, a key component in the success of steam locomotives, engines, and other coal-fired systems.

Events surrounding the failure of his steam vehicle enterprise gave rise to controversy in his time, with considerable polarisation of opinion. His daughter Anna Jane Gurney (1816–1895) was devoted to him. During her lifetime, she engaged in a campaign to ensure the blastpipe was seen as his invention.

== Biography ==
Gurney was born in St Merryn, Cornwall, England on 14 February 1793. His unusual Christian name was his grandmother's surname but taken from his godmother (Note: probably Martha Caroline Goldsworthy) who was a Maid of Honour to Queen Charlotte. Gurney's grandfather married into money, allowing his father, and to an extent himself, to live as gentlemen.

He was schooled at the Grammar School at Truro, where he showed an interest in contemporary sciences; and had the opportunity through friends to meet Richard Trevithick and see his 'Puffing Devil', a full-size steam road carriage, at Camborne.

After school he took a medical education with a Dr. Avery at Wadebridge, succeeding to the whole practice in 1813, and providing him with sufficient income to marry Elizabeth Symons, a farmer's daughter from Launcells, in 1814. The couple settled in Wadebridge where their daughter Anna Jane was born in January 1815. He practised as a surgeon, but he also became interested in chemistry and mechanical science; he was also an accomplished pianist, and constructed his own piano, described as a 'large instrument'.

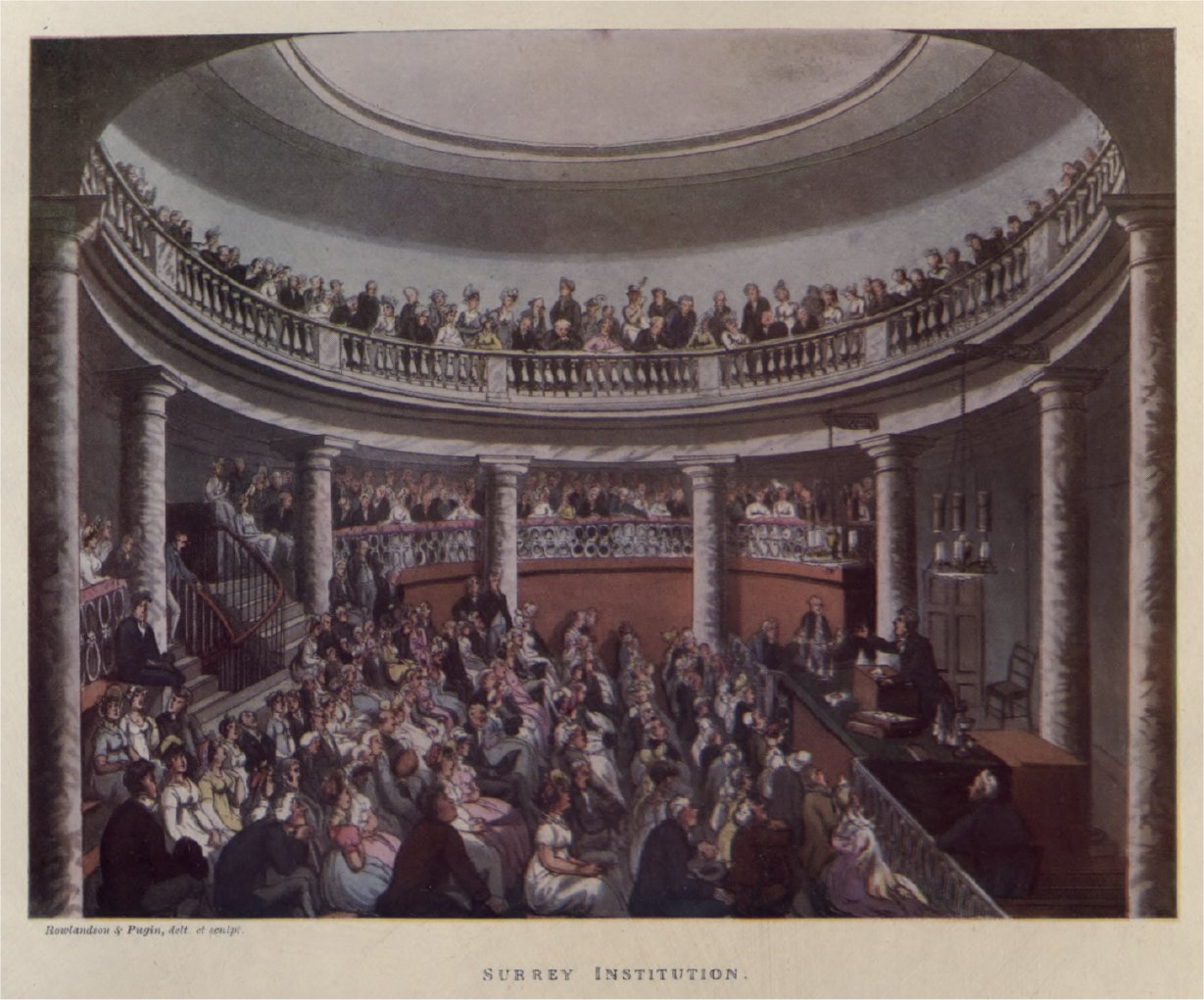
Lecture Hall of the Surrey Institution; Gurney was appointed lecturer here in 1822

He moved with his family to London in 1820, apparently discontented with rural life and wishing to seek his fortune. The family settled at 7 Argyle Street, near Hanover Square, where Gurney continued his practice as a surgeon. There he expanded his scientific knowledge and started giving a series of lectures on the elements of chemical science to the Surrey Institution, where he was appointed lecturer in 1822. A son, Goldsworthy John, was also born to the couple in that year, at Launcells (later to die relatively young in 1847).

A skill attributed to Gurney was an ability to express scientific thought on paper and through lectures. His lectures in the 1822-3 period included one on the application of steam power to road vehicles. He was also of a practical bent, and in 1823 was awarded an Isis gold medal of the Royal Society of Arts for devising an oxy-hydrogen blowpipe.

By 1825, he had started practical work on a steam carriage, taking space for a small workshop in Oxford Street and filing a first patent for "An apparatus for propelling carriages on common roads or railways – without the aid of horses, with sufficient speed for the carriage of passengers and goods". His work encompassed the development of the blastpipe, which used steam to increase the flow of air through a steam engine's chimney, so increasing the draw of air over the fire and, in short, much increasing the power-to-weight ratio of the steam engine.

In 1826 he purchased from Jacob Perkins a manufacturing works at, and moved his family to living space in, 154 Albany Street, near Regent's Park, and proceeded to improve the designs of his carriages, described below. Whilst the carriages certainly had technical merit and much promise, he was unsuccessful in commercialising them; by the spring of 1832 he had run out of funding and was forced to auction his remaining business assets, eventually losing a great deal of his own and investors' money. The circumstances of the failure engendered controversy expressed in contemporary scientific publications, as well as in committees of the House of Commons.

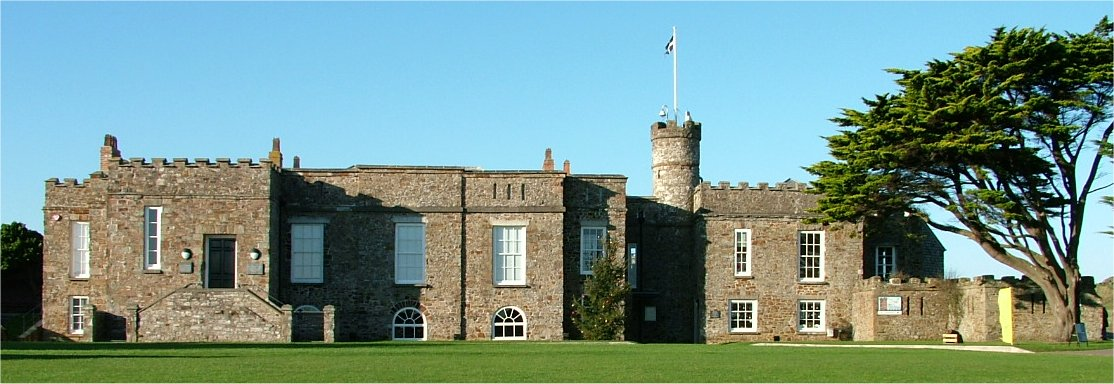
The Castle, Bude – slightly extended since Gurney's time

In 1830, Gurney leased a plot of land overlooking Summerleaze Beach in Bude, from his friend Sir Thomas Acland, and set about the construction of a new house to be built amongst the sand hills. The construction rested on an innovative concrete raft foundation, representing an early worked example of this technique. The original house called "The Castle" still stands but has been extended over the past century. It is currently owned and managed by Bude-Stratton Town Council and houses a heritage centre with a number of exhibits relating to Gurney. In this period he became godfather to William Carew Hazlitt, who notes that Gurney was involved in property development in Fulham.

At The Castle, Gurney regrouped from his carriage failure, applying his mind to the principle of illumination by the forcing of oxygen into a flame to increase the brilliance of the flame, giving rise to the Bude-Light. He also applied the principles of the blastpipe or steam jet to the ventilation of mines, as well as to the extinguishing of underground fires.

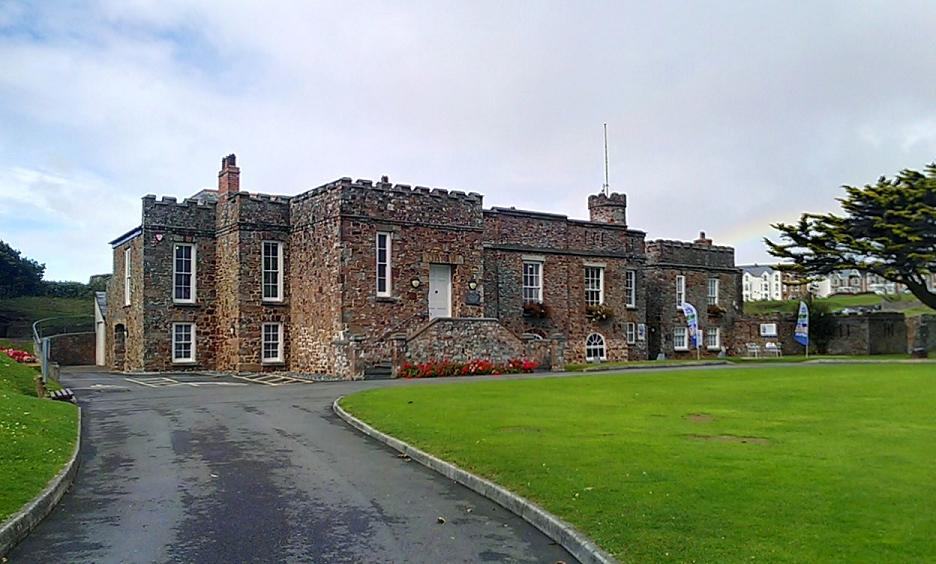
Gurney's Castle

His wife Elizabeth died in 1837, and is buried in St. Martin in the Fields. With his daughter – described as his constant companion – he moved to 'Reeds', a small house on the outskirts of Poughill, near Bude. In 1844 he bought a lease on Hornacott Manor, Boyton, 10 miles (16 km) from Bude, where he built Wodleigh Cottage for himself, and engaged his interest in farming. In 1850 he gave up the lease on The Castle. In this period, he became a consultant, applying his innovative techniques to a range of problems, notably, after 1852, to the ventilation of the new Houses of Parliament where in 1854 he was appointed 'Inspector of Ventilation'. He had previously successfully lit parliament and Trafalgar Square.

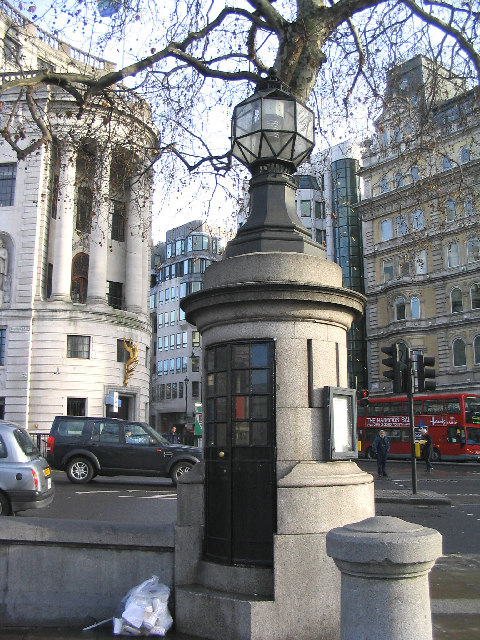
Replica Bude-Light in Trafalgar Square, with police station built into the base

Perhaps arising out of the Boyton farming connection he took a second wife, being married at St. Giles in the Field to Jane Betty, the 24-year-old daughter of a farmer from Sheepwash, Devon; Gurney was 61. The marriage appears to have been unsuccessful; there was perhaps some contention between Anna Jane (39) and her much younger stepmother. Jane Betty was removed from Gurney's will, although they were never divorced.

Gurney continued to divide his time between London and Cornwall, variously engaged in work with clients; experimenting and innovating in diverse fields such as heating (the Gurney Stove) or electrical conduction; and in improving his Hornacott estate. He was appointed president of the Launceston Agricultural Society.

In 1863, Gurney was knighted by Queen Victoria, but later that year suffered a paralytic stroke; he sold Hornacott and retired back to Reeds in Cornwall, where he lived with his devoted Anna Jane, ultimately dying on 28 February 1875. He is buried at Launcells parish church.

== Gurney's steam coach ==
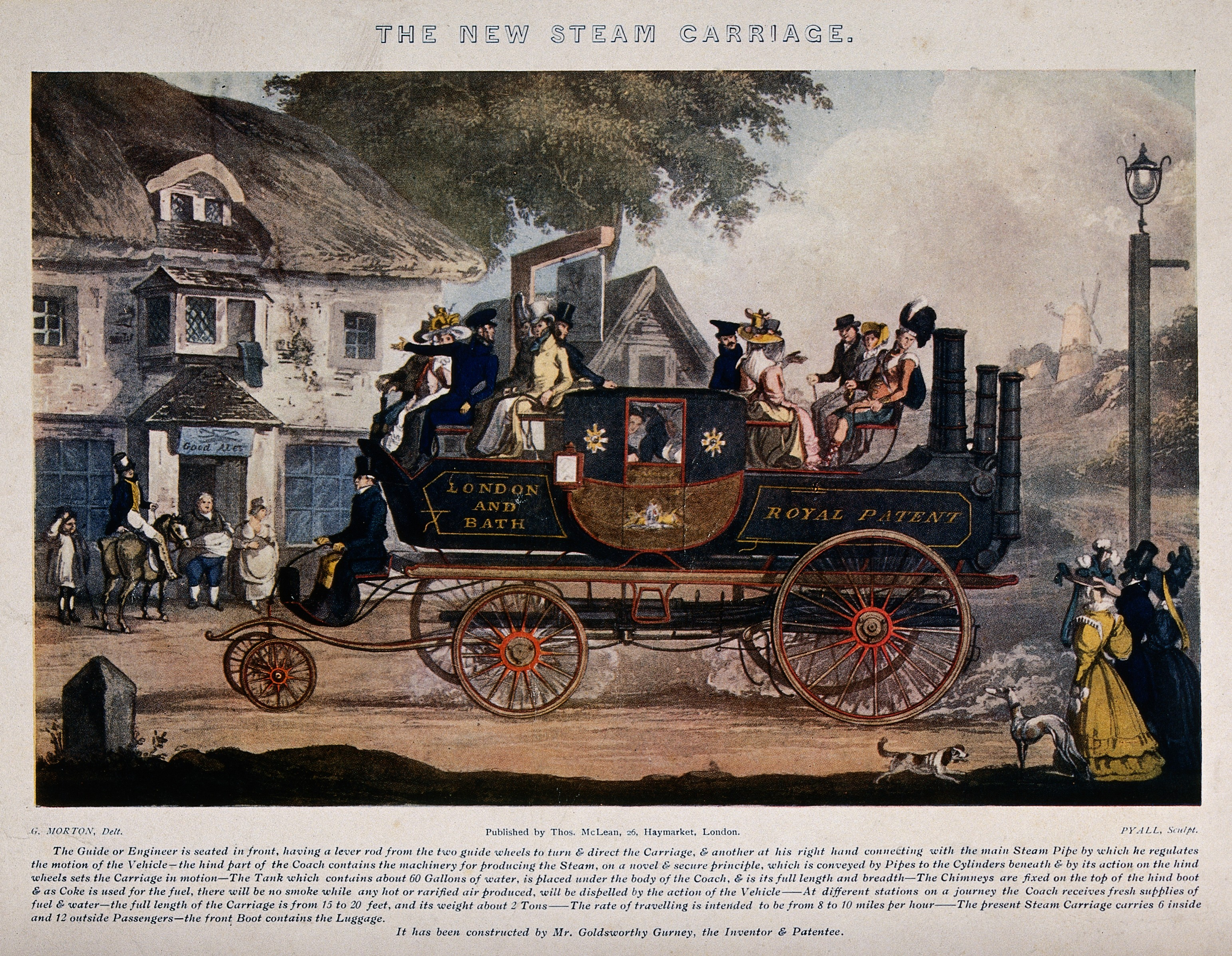
Promotional 1827 image by George Morton of Gurney's steam coach, This print is an 1828 reissue.

In the period 1824–31, Gurney designed and built a number of steam-powered road vehicles. He established a business, the Gurney Steam Carriage Company, to develop and promote steam-powered road transport. He obtained patents for various claimed technical improvements, sold franchises to investors to run services using his vehicles and built at least one steam coach and ten steam drags, steam-powered towing vehicles. The army took an interest in his activities and for them he undertook in July 1829 the first long-distance steam-powered journey by rail or road.

In 1824, Gurney began work on applying steam power to road vehicles. Throughout his period in London he resided at 7, Argyle Street, near Oxford Circus. Initially he had a workshop close by, which was drawn by G.J.Scharf. It was a room, suitable for making a boiler, parts of a vehicle or a working model, not a full-size vehicle.

In early 1825, he was approached by Walter Hancock, who had just completed his own first prototype steam carriage; they agreed to meet in Regent's Park where Gurney would demonstrate the prototype which he had had built based on his own working model. During a journey of two miles along a well-made road, the vehicle, which was a steam drag (tow-vehicle) stopped involuntarily five times. The two parted.

On 14 May 1825, Gurney obtained patent No. 5170 for his implementation of propellers, mechanical legs whose action imitated that of horses. These were shaped like a long "s", ʃ, and can be seen in front of the rear wheels on the promotional 1827 image. On 21 October 1825 he obtained patent No. 5270 for his design of a lightweight tubular boiler.

In 1826, Gurney bought the manufactory works at 154, Albany Street, in the Regent's Park district of London. Just to the north was Regent's Park Barracks, the home of the Life Guards and the Royal Artillery. Gurney subsequently used the barracks yard as the main testing ground for his vehicles. In February 1827 the partnership Gurney and Co was dissolved: it was between Gurney and Colonel James Viney of the Royal Artillery.

Gurney was by no means the only pioneer in the history of steam road vehicles – Trevithick was first and Hancock a contemporary – but Gurney had a flair for publicity and drew wealthy – and well-connected – investors, such as Colonel Viney. After the dissolution of his partnership with Gurney, Viney paid him £5,000 for a share in the patents and the licence for the Gloucester - Cheltenham road. Such investments enabled Gurney to get ahead with building, testing and improving his vehicles.

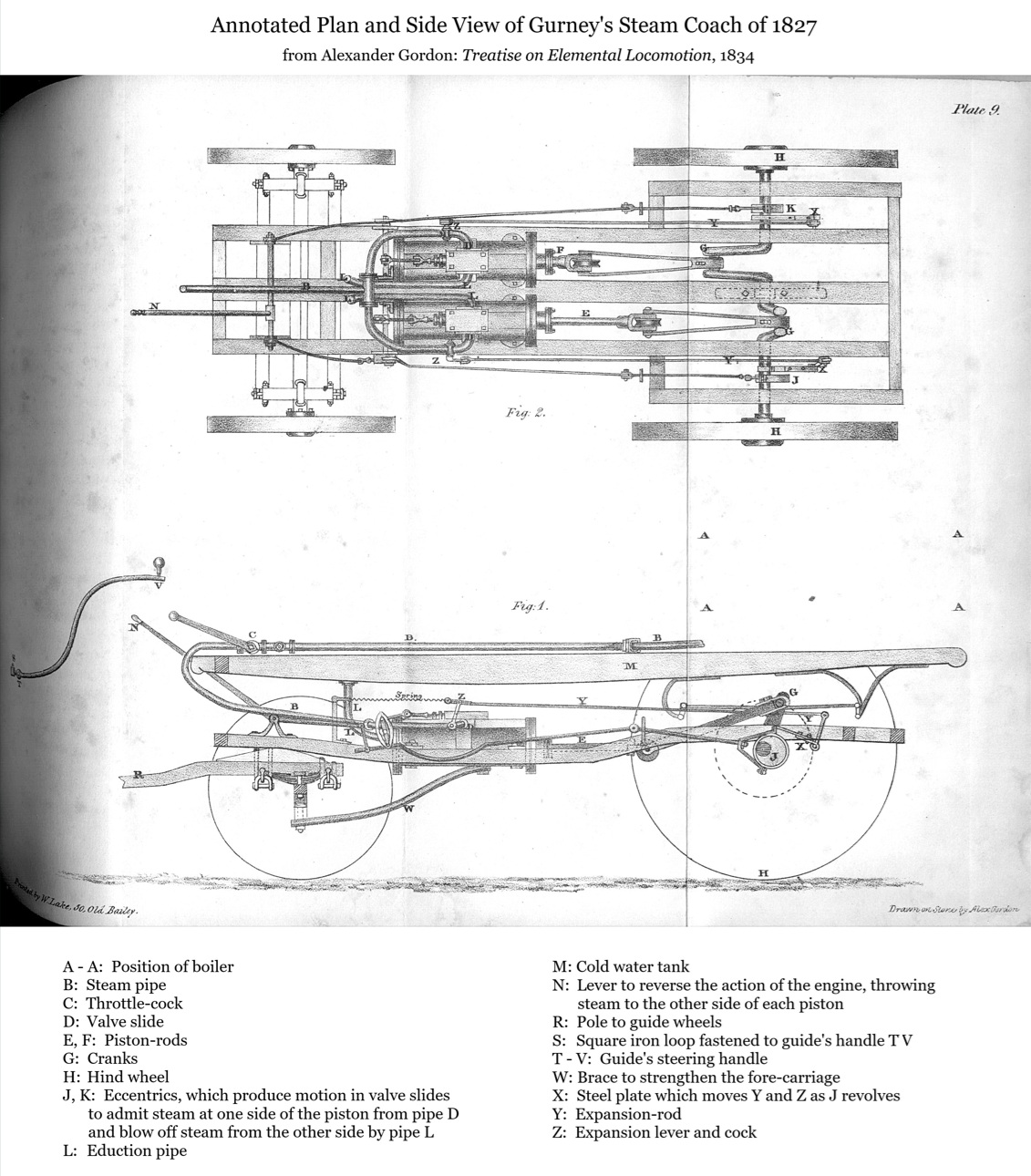
Plan and elevation of the machinery of Gurney's steam coach, from Alexander Gordon's Elemental Locomotion, 1834

Gurney solved some problems which faced those developing steam carriages, but not others. He placed the two double-acting cylinders horizontally in the chassis, enabling him to have the heavy rear part of the carriage, which contained the boiler, sprung. He adopted a cranked transmission to the rear wheels, although this did lead to broken rods, axles and spokes. He developed a lightweight high-pressure water-tube boiler which he claimed was less likely to explode (although this did happen to one of his steam drags after the safety valve was removed).

Along with his contemporaries, he used crude clutches on each driven wheel which were engaged manually when the axle was stationary. In the absence of a differential, the drive was usually taken to a single rear wheel; the second wheel was engaged only when extra traction was required (going uphill or on a loose surface) or when using engine braking (going downhill).

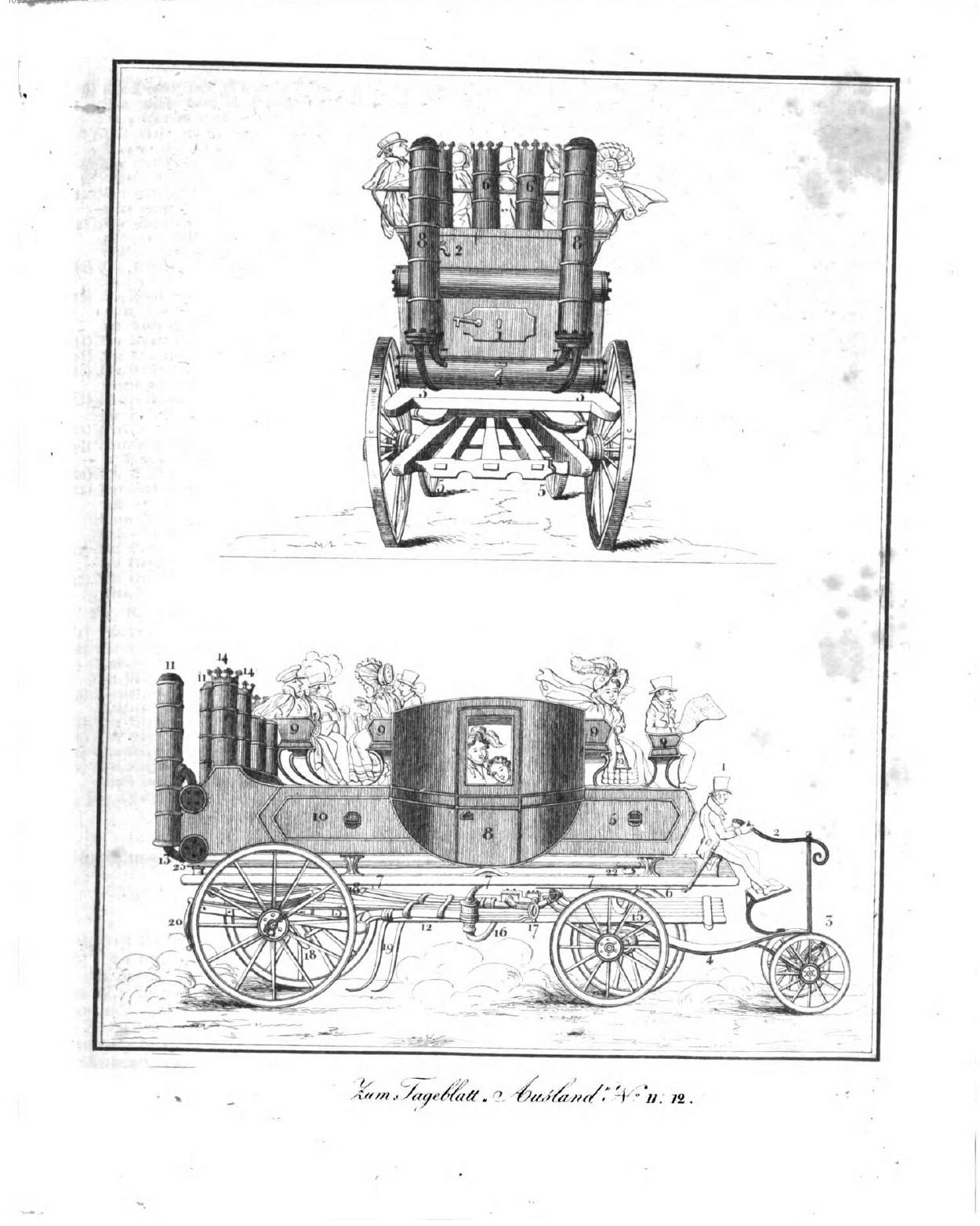
Views of Gurney's steam coach from Das Ausland of 11&12 January 1828 showing cranked drive to rear axle as well as propellers

Gurney later said that his first prototype weighed four tons and that he worked to reduce this to 2 tons for his steam coach, the vehicle for which he is best known. This took the form of a large stage coach with 6 passengers inside and 12 (he later claimed 15) outside, plus the guide, who doubled as the engine-man/stoker. The body of the vehicle was 15' long, or 20' including the front pole and a pair of steered pilot wheels.

The print "The New Steam Carriage" at the top of this section is an 1828 reprint of an earlier print by George Morton. It shows the coach in front of a pub with propellers in front of the rear wheels. The caption states "It has been constructed..." and "The rate of travelling is intended to be from 8 to 10 miles per hour". This dates it to mid-1827. The "London and Bath" livery was perhaps an inducement to get Major Dobbyn to invest: in September 1827 he paid Gurney £6,000 for the franchise for the London, Bath and Bristol road, for which Gurney would build him eight coaches.

In tests, Gurney found that the propellers didn't work well and added a cranked drive to the rear axle with clutches to each wheel. At the end of the driven axle were "crotches" (i.e. two metal fingers) which acted on metal blocks fixed to the nave of the wheel. A handle fixed to the hub of the wheel could be wound in to engage the metal blocks with the crotches, thereby driving the wheel. The propellers were retained for use on hills, when the wheels were expected to slip.

On 8 September 1827 Gurney's steam coach was demonstrated on "Old Highgate Hill" (now Highgate West Hill), reaching its highest point "opposite Holly Terrace" (where the road steepens from 1:14 to 1:8). On its return, the coach ran away, went into a gutter outside Holly Lodge and a wheel broke. The machine had to be recovered to the works by a horse. In testimony to a Parliamentary inquiry in 1831, Gurney blamed workmen who "neglected to lock the wheel", i.e. to engage the clutch on the second rear wheel, so that engine braking would be applied through both rear wheels.

After this setback, the vehicle didn't return to public view until December 1827. Meanwhile, G.J.Scharf drew it in October 1827 and made a lithograph of it "running in Regent's Park on 6th November 1827". This does not mean that it was being demonstrated publicly: Gurney's factory was in the Regent's Park area of London, as was Regent's Park Barracks. The lithograph shows accurate detail which cross-checks with technical drawings in Alexander Gordon's Treatise on Elemental Locomotion (1834).

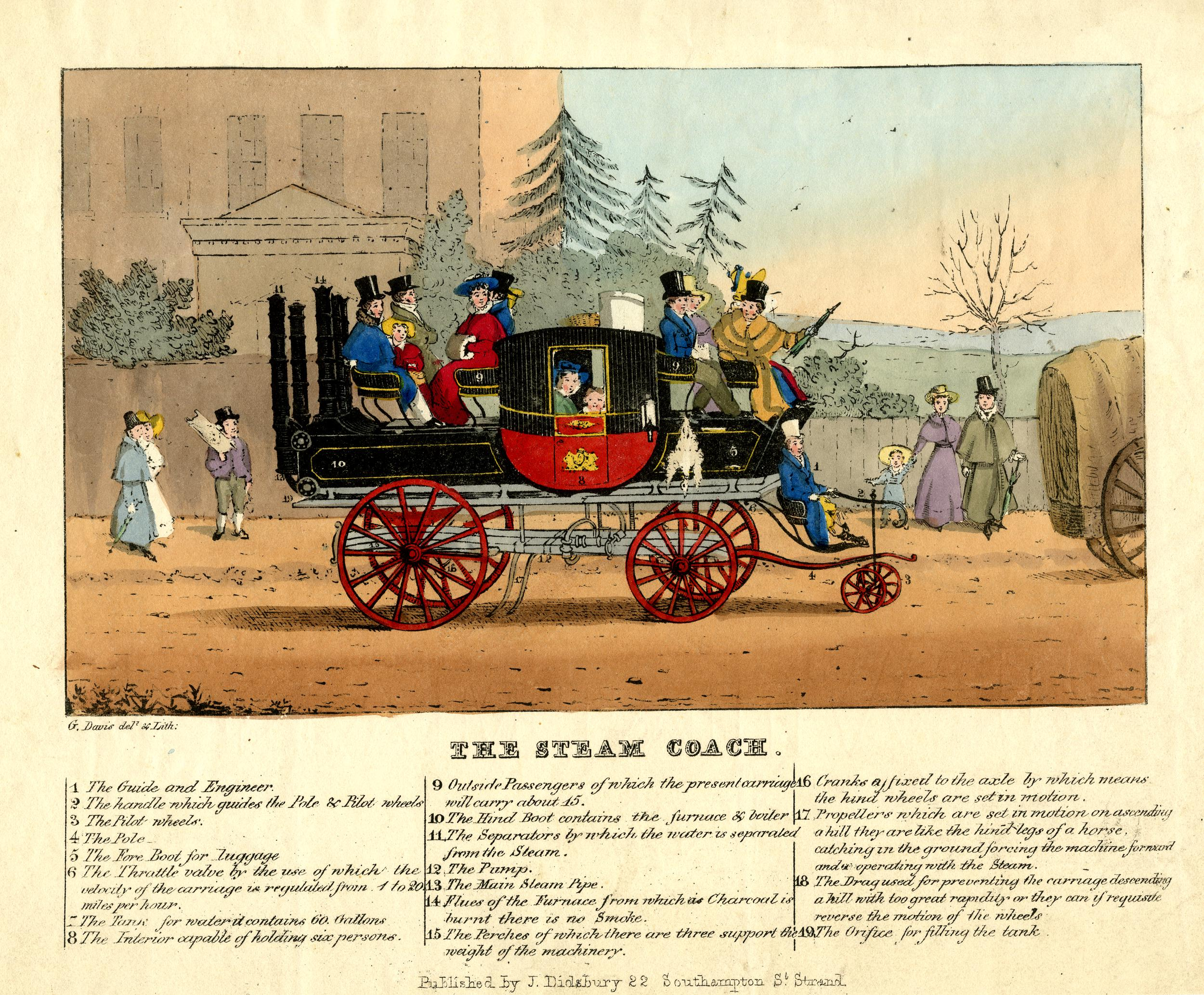
Gurney's steam coach, a contemporary print with detailed descriptions of the parts

Further demonstrations in Regent's Park followed in December 1827, when many reports appeared and prints proliferated. Morton's was reissued with a tree, pub sign and outbuilding added to the background scene. Many others showed numbered parts, together with descriptions (see image). Scharf's lithograph in November had shown two chimneys rather than four, but these prints echoed Morton's image with four. The coach appeared either on its own or in a variety of scenes remote from Regent's Park.

Some, such as this print, included a rear view as well as a side view. These views and the accompanying reports are so similar to one another that they can be inferred to be derived from a "handout" issued by Gurney, which included such points as that he proposed to pay the turnpikes half the toll which stage coaches did (as steam coaches weren't listed on the toll board, they were legally exempt).

On 16 January 1828 Prince Pückler-Muskau reported that he had travelled on the coach:

The new steam-carriage is completed, and goes five miles in half an hour on trial in Regent's Park. But there was something to repair every moment.

=== Projected Improvements ===
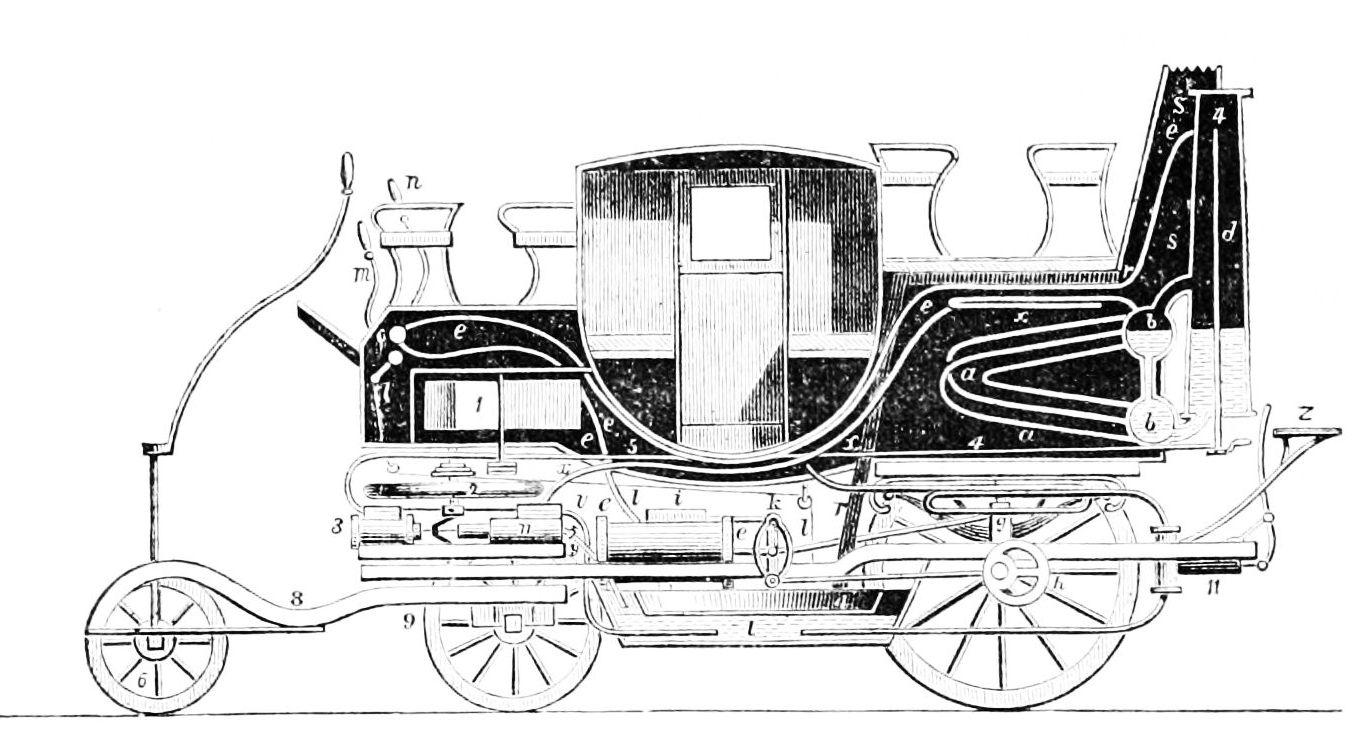
Cross-section of Gurney's proposed improved steam coach from The Register of Arts of 10 May 1828

On 11 October 1827 (i.e. before the public demonstrations), Gurney filed patent drawings for an improved steam coach. A simplified version of this was subsequently published together with an explanation of the parts (see image).

The patent drawing shows where Gurney saw the need for change. The propellers are abandoned. The boiler is substantially larger. A blower is added in the fore boot and the four chimneys are replaced by a single wide one between the two separators. The transmission was simplified with clutches in which the two surfaces were either bolted together or left free to rotate independently.

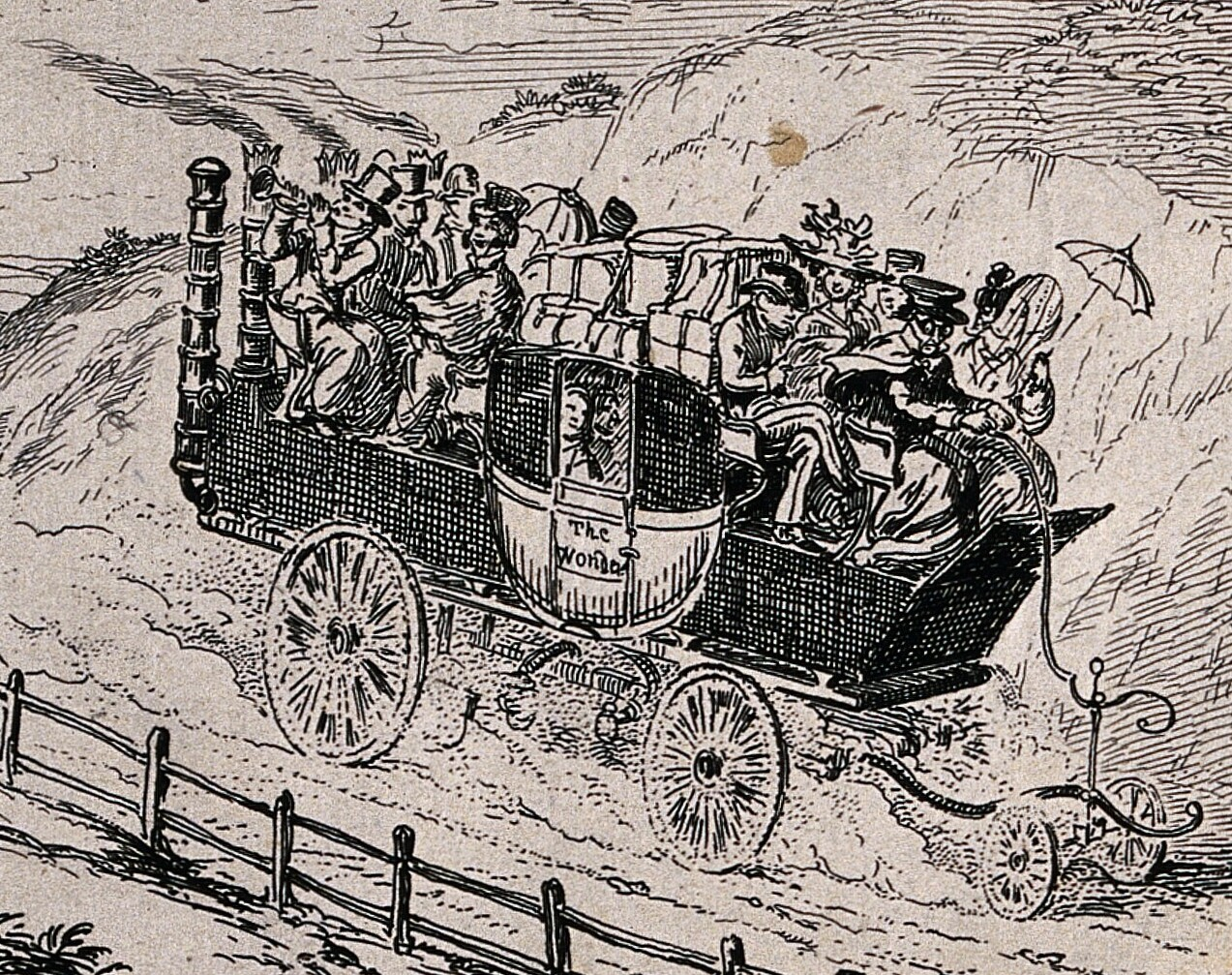
Gurney's steam coach of 1828 caricatured by Cruikshank

The only revision shown in the 1827 patent which has been documented to have been made was the guide's move to the front bench on top of the fore boot. This is depicted in a contemporary print showing the steam coach going "up hill to Barnet through Highgate Tunnel" (now Archway) on 14 June 1828 (Note: The gradient is exaggerated: it was a maximum of 1:22; see p.302 of Gordon's Elemental Locomotion (1834).). Apart from the guide on the front bench for outside passengers, there were only 10 other people outside. The two separators at the back can be made out, but not the chimneys, so these did not rise as high as the heads of the seated passengers. Cruikshank's 1829 cartoon, "The horses - going to the dogs" also has the guide controlling the coach from the front bench, but has four tall chimneys, as on most of the images.

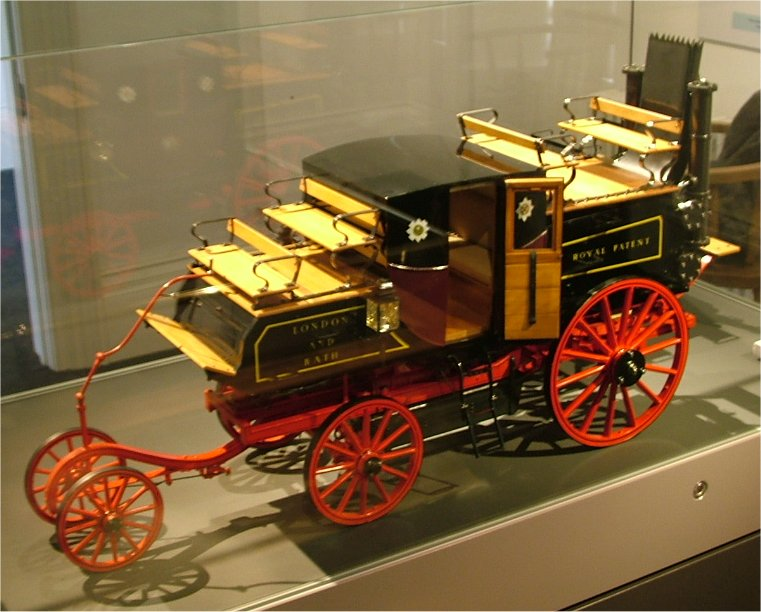
Model of Gurney's proposed improved steam coach in The Castle, Bude.

The patent drawings have been used to build models such as that at The Castle, Bude and a working scale model at The Science Museum, London

== Gurney's steam drags ==
During 1828, Gurney switched from developing his steam coach to producing a steam drag, a small road-going steam locomotive which could pull a carriage, an omnibus or any other wheeled vehicle. A key figure in this was Sir Charles Dance, a retired colonel of the Life Guards (one of the regiments based at Regent Park Barracks). Five years later he told a meeting in Westminster of 40 MPs, peers and others that:

... several years ago he had been induced to consider the application of Steam to locomotive purposes as important to the military operations of the country, and had subsequently embarked capital in Mr Gurney's experiments ...

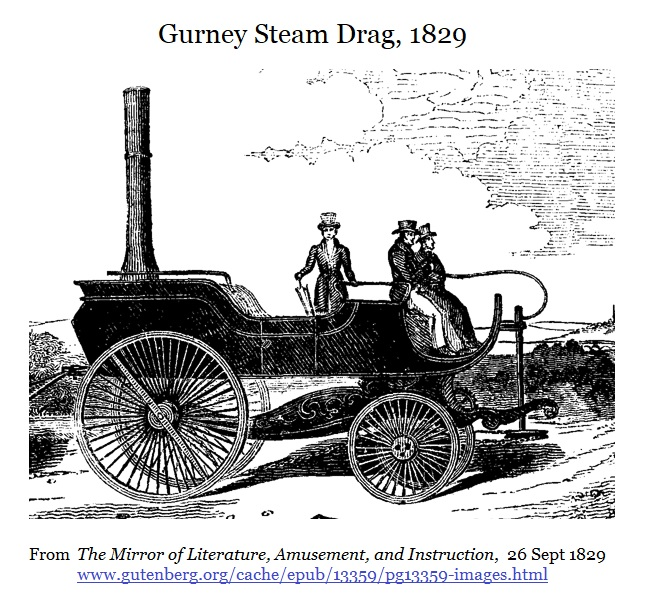
Gurney's steam drag of 1829

On 22 July 1829, Gurney's new steam drag was on view at Dance's home at Bushey in Hertfordshire. Present was General Sir James Willoughby Gordon FRS, Quartermaster-General of the Army. His responsibilities included equipping and moving the army and its materiel. The next day, General Gordon wrote a highly favourable report of what he had seen at Bushey. The vehicle had performed for half an hour at up to 10 mph, uphill and around corners, with a barouche in tow.

Five days later, on 27 July 1829, a procession of four vehicles set out for Bath from Cranford Bridge, just to the west of Hounslow, the main coaching station west of London. At General Gordon's instigation, Gurney's drag was to be tested on the first long-distance journey at speed by steam locomotion.

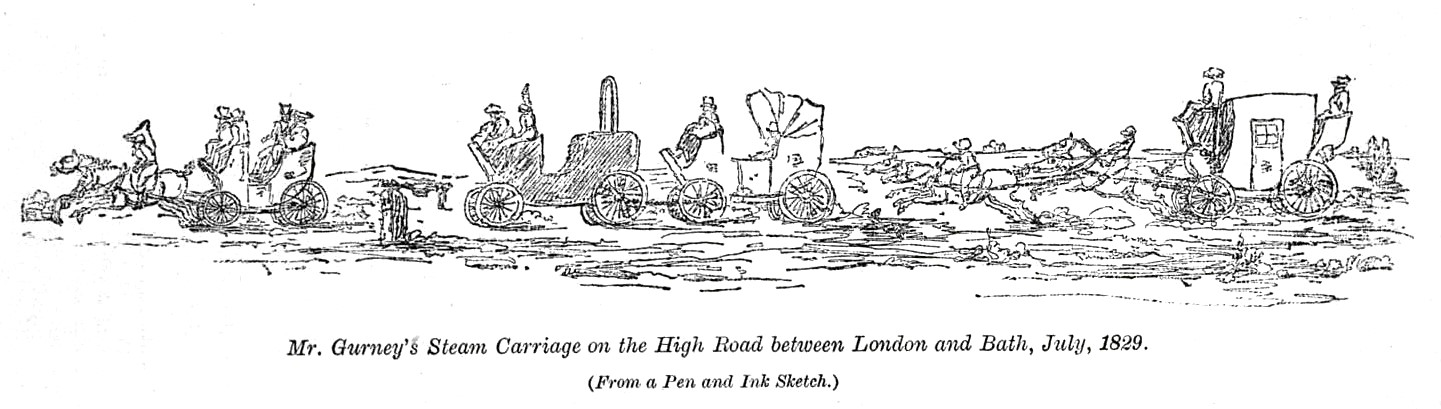
Sketch of the cavalcade containing Gurney's steam drag on its way to Bath, July 1829

Sandwiched between carriages drawn by horses were Gurney's steam drag with Gurney aboard, drawing his private carriage. Dance's account of the journey is at pp.265-268 of The Taylor Papers.

At Melksham there was a fray with people throwing stones at the vehicle and its occupants. The stoker was injured, the vehicle damaged and it had to be escorted under guard to Bath to prevent further attacks. It remained there for two days for repairs and was then escorted back to Melksham. Gurney claimed the return from Melksham to Hounslow took 10 hours (including stoppages) for a distance of 84 miles.

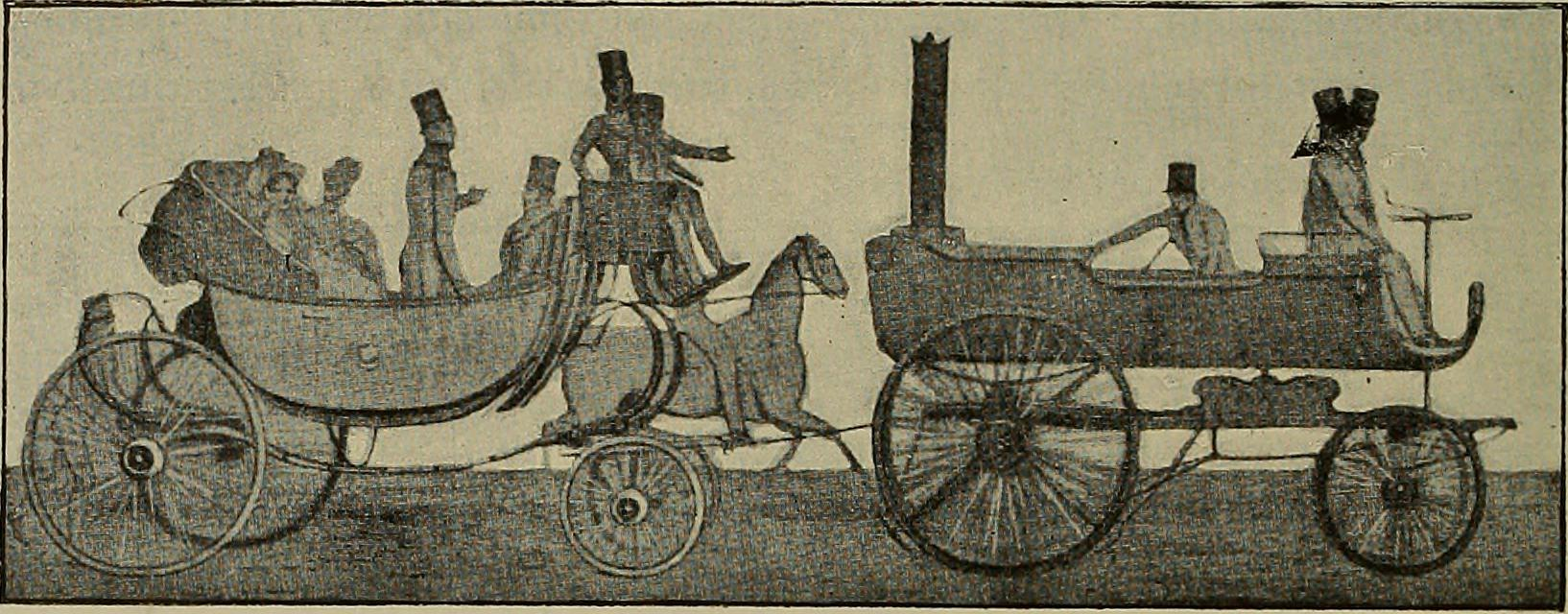
Gurney's steam drag drawing a barouche containing the Duke of Wellington (standing) at Hounslow on 12th August 1829

On 12th August 1829, the Duke of Wellington, who was then Prime Minister, inspected Gurney's steam drag at the Hounslow Barracks yard and travelled in a barouche pulled by a drag (see image).

=== Gurney's Light Steam Drags ===
In March 1830, Gurney acquiesced to the entreaties of the immensely rich William Crawshay II to send a steam drag to Cyfarthfa, Merthyr Tydfil, to test its suitability for use as a rail locomotive at his father's ironworks at Hirwain.

After switching to cast-iron wheels, the engine, which Crawshay reported weighed 30 cwt, acquitted itself well. It is not clear whether Crawshay kept the drag; by the end of 1830, Crawshay owned one. In a letter of 23 February 1832, he reported how pleased he was with its performance during calendar year 1831.

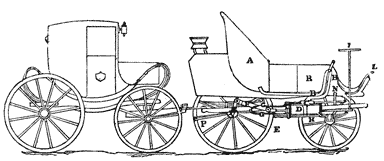
Side view of Gurney's light steam drag of 1830, from Gordon's Elemental Locomotion, 1832

In the 1832 edition of Elemental Locomotion, Gordon describes the latest light drag which Gurney had built:

The shape of the body of this steamer is what coachmakers call a "brisca." It is entirely used as a drag for other carriages ... No passengers are allowed to be in this drag: the coach-box being occupied by the conductor, and the interior by the boiler at A, and by the engineer with fuel and water at R ... Mr. Gurney has placed the chimney in the back of the body, and it is so constructed that it cannot be seen by horses on the road. The water for the boiler is poured in to the tanks through a funnel which resembles a "dickey'' [seat for servants] on the hind boot.

The chimney appears to have been a triangular-section hood above the boiler, with a transverse outlet at the top, similar to that on his patent design for an improved steam coach. As Gurney later said, it would not be seen by approaching horses.

In 1831, Gurney built and sent the first two of a planned six steam drags to John Ward in Glasgow for use on the Edinburgh - Glasgow road. One of them made a successful trip to Paisley and Renfrew, but attempts on the road to Edinburgh failed, leaving the vehicle damaged. Gurney and his engineer returned to London, having (as the engineer thought) disabled the vehicle by removing the safety valve. Ward's engineer patched it up for a demonstration at the Glasgow cavalry barracks in June 1831. It exploded, seriously injuring two boys. Ward withdrew from his contract with Gurney.

The remains of the Lord of the Isles (which exploded) rests in Glasgow Riverside Museum.

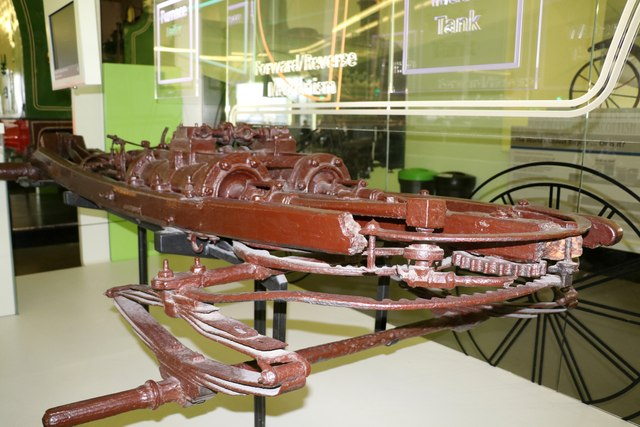
Chassis and steered front axle of Gurney steam drag in Glasgow Riverside Museum

This vehicle confirms a detail reported by Gordon. The rear axle, just inboard of where the wheel would sit, has flats which form a hexagon. Gordon's plan shows what Gurney called a carrier, an iron bar forming a diameter of the wheel which transfers torque from the axle to the felloes of the wheel, thereby allowing lighter spokes to be used. In his evidence to the 1831 Select Committee, Gurney was asked about the drive to the wheels:

In general, were the wheels connected together, or had they an independent motion? Always one was attached to the axle; they had no independent motion; this will be seen by reference to No. 5 on the arm or carrier of the wheel (which is a part of the axle,) and can be attached to the wheel at pleasure by a bolt, making the wheel also in that case part of the axle.

Gordon describes it differently:

[the carrier,] being pressed up by the engine against the bolt which is shown above it, must force the wheel in that direction, and thus propel the carriage

Gordon's mechanism would allow the carriage to go round shallow bends with the clutches on both rear wheels engaged (although only the wheel on the inside of the bend would be turned directly by the engine), echoing a similar mechanism used by Hancock.

Gurney built three steam drags for William Hanning, his largest financial backer: he paid Gurney some £10,000, with more to come, for a planned eight drags for use on routes to Exeter and Plymouth from London and Bristol. These first three vehicles were tested on the road to Finchley via what is now Archway Road. Hanning pulled out in 1831 in the wake of the collapse of Sir Charles Dances' service and reports of the explosion in Glasgow.

=== Sir Charles Dance's steam omnibus services ===
During 1830, Sir Charles Dance bought from Colonel Viney his interest in the Gloucester - Cheltenham road and from Gurney the franchises for the London - Birmingham, Birmingham - Bristol and London - Holyhead roads.. He commissioned from Gurney three identical steam carriages for the Cheltenham - Gloucester road. These were to carry passengers as well as tow an omnibus; together with the omnibus, each carriage could carry 38 passengers.

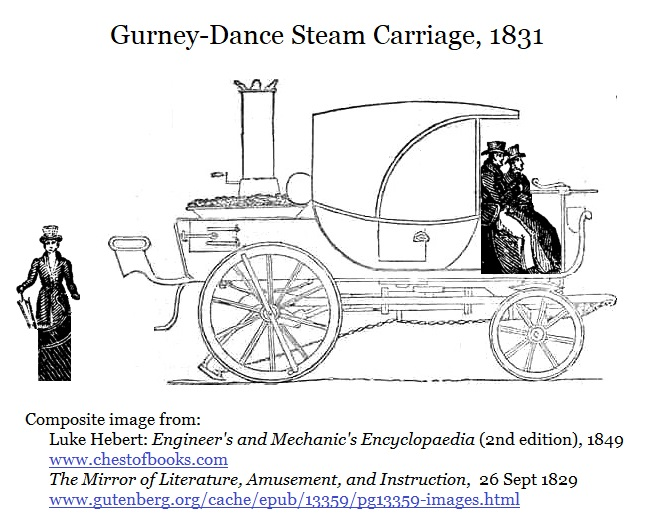
Steam carriage built by Goldsworthy Gurney for Sir Charles Dance's 1831 Omnibus Service between Cheltenham and Gloucester

The vehicles were a hybrid of Gurney's light steam drag and his patent design for an improved steam coach. The wheelbase was longer than the light steam drag and the boiler was moved to the rear, attended to by an engine-man in a seat placed behind the drag. It was given a conventional chimney, rather than the triangular-section hood with a transverse slit. This was the first of Gurney's vehicles which is known to have used steam blast to the fire. It led to complaints about the noise frightening horses, which could see the obvious chimney.

At the local weighbridge, one of the steam carriages was found to weigh 3 tons, rather than the 2 tons which Gurney had claimed. He attributed this to its having been built "principally under the superintendence of another person". When challenged about its frightening horses, Gurney disclaimed responsibility for design of the bodywork. In this he appears to have been correct: it was very different from Gurney's light drags, its form having been dictated by Dance.

One feature of this drag was its brake, shown behind the rear wheel on the image. When released, it dug into the surface of the road like a drag anchor. Gurney's steam coach used a shoe brake on the rear wheels to supplement the use of the throttle to control the supply of steam to the engine. Another mechanism which Gurney claimed could be used was the lever to reverse the engine, but this imposed enormous stresses on the machinery. When tried in 1833 on one of these vehicles, it broke a connecting-rod.

On 1 February 1831, Sir Charles Dance started trials of his new vehicles on the 9-mile journey between Cheltenham and Gloucester. A service running twice a day in each direction, 6 days a week, began on 21 February. Over the next four months, the three carriages and their omnibuses made 396 journeys (95% of those planned), averaging 55 minutes for a journey which the horse-coaches did in 60.

The service was brought to a halt after four months by opposition, particularly from the turnpike trustees (i.e. landowners and other local worthies). Dance contributed to this by not paying any tolls as steam coaches were not listed in the schedules to the turnpike acts for the road. Hostility culminated in the laying of eighteen inches of fresh stone in a hollow on the road, causing one of the cranks on the rear axle to break. Other factors leading to Dance's cessation of the service were:

- it was losing money heavily: the introduction of his service had resulted in overcapacity and a price war, with fares falling from 2s (2-horse coach) or 2s 6d (4-horse coach) to 1s;
- a revised turnpike act would impose a toll on each of Dance's services twice that which applied to 4-horse coaches.

== Bankruptcy and parliamentary inquiry ==
In 1831, Goldsworthy gave evidence to a House of Commons select committee, on the use of Steam carriages, and related tolls.

A charge of £2 was levied on each steam carriage journey, whilst the toll for a horsedrawn carriage was 2 shillings (one-twentieth of the amount). This may be contrasted with a contemporary exchequer loan to the railway developers of £100,000. Maceroni continues:

In addition to this flagrant outrage against justice and utility, the worthy squires and magistrates of the Cheltenham district, suddenly, without any necessity, covered a long tract of the road with a layer of loose gravel, a foot deep, which, adding to the above-mentioned difficulties and impediments, put an entire stop to the undertaking.

At the same time, press coverage of an accident befalling a Glasgow steam drag adversely affected the reputation of the vehicles. Gurney was bankrupted with debts of £232,000.

Sufficient was the concern about Gurney's bankruptcy, and sufficient were his contacts, that a further select committee was convened from 1831 to 1835, on Mr.Goldsworthy Gurney's Case. Its final report stated:

Mr Goldsworthy Gurney was the first person to successfully operate steam carriages on common roads, and he took out patents for his invention in 1825 and 1826–27. In 1830 Mr Gurney entered into contracts with various individuals for the commercial exploitation of his invention, carrying passengers at a lower fare than horse carriages. In 1831 more than 50 private bills were passed by Parliament imposing prohibitive tolls on steam carriages (two pounds or more, while horse carriages might pay six shillings or less), and the contractors suspended their operations, pending a petition to Parliament. A select Committee was appointed, and concluded that steam carriages were safe, quick, cheap, and less damaging to roads than horse carriages, that they would be a benefit to the public and the prohibitive tolls should be removed. A bill to this effect was passed by the Commons but rejected by the Lords.

Mr. Gurney, having kept open his factory until this point was forced to close it and sell off his materials and tools at a loss. The contractors withdrew from the business.

The effect of the Acts passed by Parliament have been to make an otherwise profitable business no longer viable. Mr Gurney's losses included the costs of keeping his workshop open for six years, loss of contracts, loss of mileage duty on the various routes and the costs of patents. He also lost the advantage of being the first to develop a working steam carriage, as others used the intervening period to develop their own machines, and lost his advantage over the railways. The total loss can be calculated at over £200,000. This left him unable to either build and operate steam carriages, or to protect his patents.

Sections of those Acts imposing prohibitory tolls on steam carriages should be immediately repealed, and such tolls should be replaced by those for which horse carriages are liable. Mr Gurney's patent should be extended at public expense for a period of fourteen years beyond the date of its expiry, or a sum of not less than £5000 should be offered to Mr Gurney in lieu of such extension. Other parties have an interest in Mr. Gurney's patent, and half of the money or benefits should be kept aside for Mr. Gurney exclusively.

=== Coda: Dance's Activities in 1833 ===
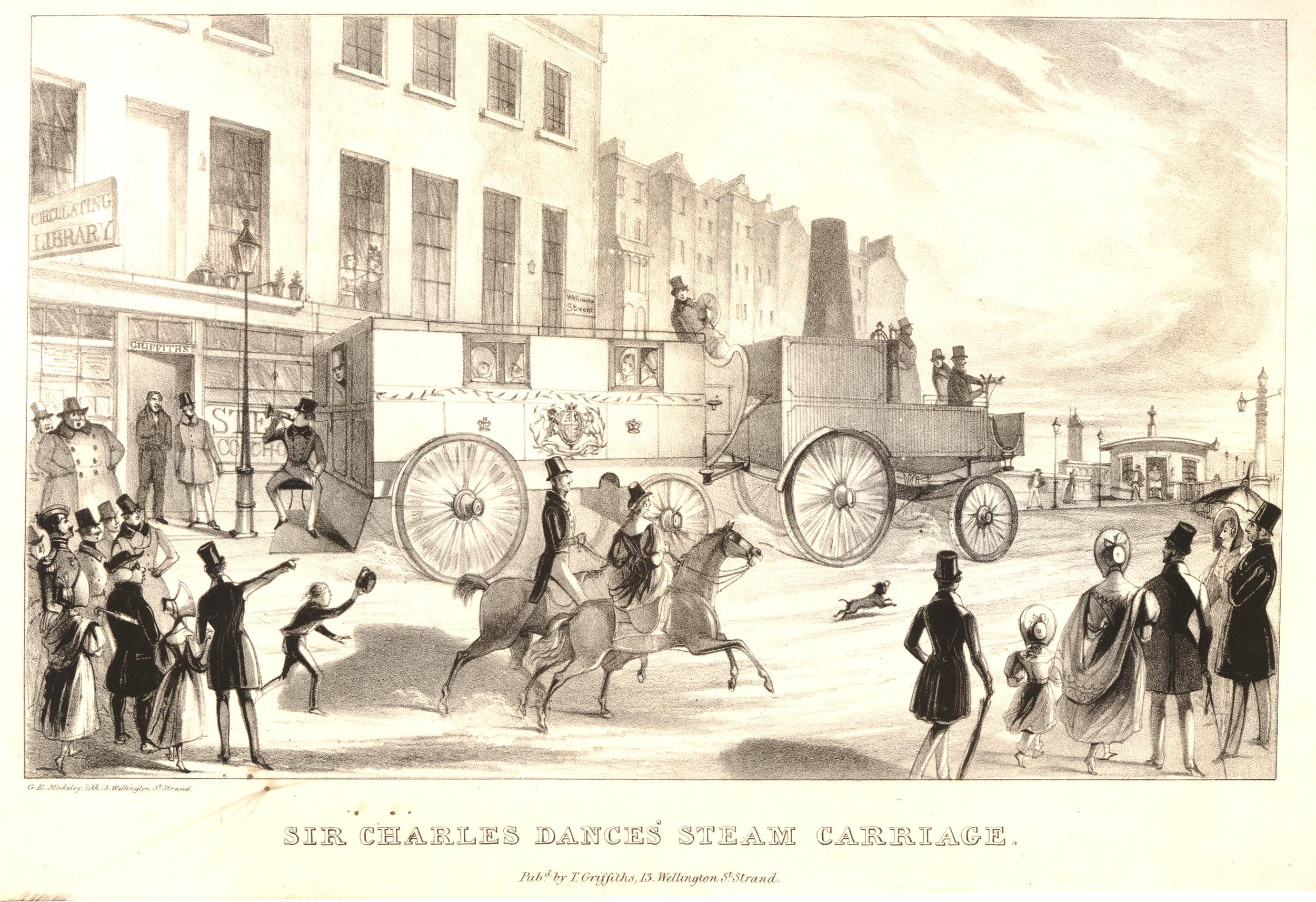
Sir Charles Dance's steam-drawn omnibus about to cross Waterloo Bridge on its service to Greenwich, October 1833

In 1833 Dance came to London with his steam-carriage, and had it overhauled by Messrs. Maudslay, Sons, and Field, a leading firm of steam and mechanical engineers. The work undertaken led to patent No. 6465 by Sir Charles Dance and Joshua Field for improvements to the boiler.

The result was the rebodied steam carriage seen in a print of it setting off across Waterloo Bridge on the service to Greenwich. This ran for a fortnight from 12 October 1833 as a demonstration of the capabilities of steam transport on the road.

== Perspectives on Gurney's steam carriages ==
In sum, Gurney produced:

- one steam coach
- patent drawings for a second (or revisions to the original)
- a prototype steam drag, which made the journey to Bath and back in 1829
- at least six light steam drags: one sold to William Crawshay II for use at Hirwain; two for John Ward which were sent to Scotland; and three for William Hanning which were tested on the road to Finchley;
- three steam carriages for, and to the specification of, Sir Charles Dance. These were described as drags but carried passengers as well as towing an omnibus..

Gurney was undoubtedly the highest-flying entrepreneur of steam carriages in Britain, raising and spending large sums of money before his bankruptcy in 1832. Many of those who bought franchises for routes and prepaid for steam carriages received little or nothing in return.

Writing in 1831, before Gurney's bankruptcy, Luke Hebert, editor of The Register of Arts and Patent Inventions lamented how much money had been poured into Gurney's activities for (as he saw it) so few and such small improvements in technology:

Mr Walter Hancock has, with plans more original and single-handed, far surpassed Mr Gurney, and at a thirtieth part of the expenditure.

In 1840, Dionysius Lardner declared:

First and most prominent in the history of the application of steam to the propelling of carriages on turnpike roads stands the name of Mr. Goldsworthy Gurney ...

in his Automobile Biographies, Lyman Horace Weeks comments that

by writers of the period Gurney received a great deal of credit and an abundance of advertising for his work. He was especially conspicuous in the Parliamentary investigations regarding steam carriages. On the whole, however, it is generally considered that he was proclaimed far beyond his merits, especially in comparison with other rivals such as Hancock, Maceroni and others.

== Other work ==
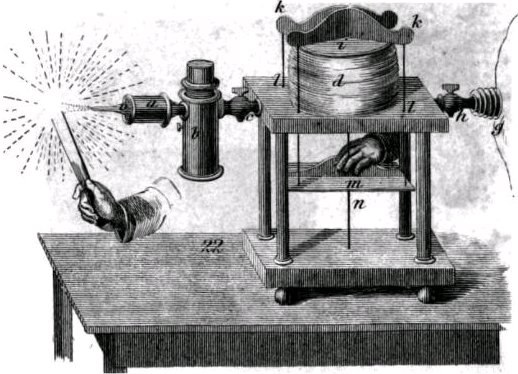
Nineteenth century bellows-operated oxy-hydrogen blowpipe, including two different types of flashback arrestor

A key development of his time at the Surrey Institute was use of the oxy-hydrogen blowpipe, normally credited to Robert Hare, in which an intensely hot flame was created by burning a jet of oxygen and hydrogen together. The blowpipe was the underpinning of limelight, and Gurney was its first exponent.

According to A History of The Growth of The Steam-Engine by Robert H. Thurston, Gurney was a proponent of the ammonia engine. "In 1822… Mr. Goldsworthy Gurney, who subsequently took an active part in their introduction, stated, in his lectures, that "elementary power is capable of being applied to propel carriages along common roads with great political advantage, and the floating knowledge of the day places the object within reach." He made an ammonia engine—probably the first ever made—and worked it so successfully, that he made use of it in driving a little locomotive."

Arising from his successes with mine ventilation he was commissioned in 1852 to improve the gas lighting, heating, and especially the ventilation systems for the new Houses of Parliament at Westminster. Although he had some success in moving air around the palace buildings, ridding the legislature of the foul smell of the Thames was beyond his skill.

Gurney worked on many other projects, with interests and patents extending from improved steam engine design, to electric telegraphy and the design of musical instruments.

=== Steam Jet ===
The steam-jet or blastpipe served to increase the draw of air through pipes, and was applied to improve mine and sewerage ventilation, to increase the efficiency of steam-powered stationary engines and blast furnaces, and road or rail vehicles. After the Rainhill trials of 1829, there was considerable controversy as to the genesis of this invention since it became associated in the mind of the public with George Stephenson—probably through the agency of Samuel Smiles' biography of that man. In her 1875 letter to The Times, his daughter traces the path of the idea: Gurney communicated it to Timothy Hackworth, who employed it in his Royal George locomotive of 1827, from which Stephenson allegedly took his inspiration for its inclusion in the Rocket. This is belied by Gurney's use of a fan to provide the blast in his patent design of October 1827 for an improved version of his steam carriage. The first of Gurney's steam carriages to which people objected on the grounds of noise were Sir Charles Dance's on the Cheltenham - Gloucester road in 1831. This was attributed to the use of steam blast.

More recent letters acquired by the National Railway Museum suggest that, in fact, Hackworth may have discovered the idea first and/or independently; and Herbert—clearly not a fan of Gurney—seeks to debunk claims for Gurney's invention by comparing the output of Gurney's carriages with those of Trevithick. Other problems faced by Gurney's claim to have invented this is the clear use of it by Trevithick as confirmed by contemporary notes and also the patent applied for it by another party in the early 19th century.

He extended the use of the steam-jet to the cleaning of sewers, bridging his mechanical and medical knowledge in the service of the eradication of cholera in the metropolis; and in dealing with mine fires—notably bringing under control a fire known as the burning waste of Clackmannan, which in 1851 had raged for more than 30 years over an area of 26 acres (11 ha), at the South Sauchie Colliery near Alloa. Gurney injected some 8M cubic feet of chokedamp (a mixture of nitrogen and carbon dioxide) into the mine by means of his steam-jet to extinguish the combustion; and after three weeks, drove water into the mine as a spray from the steam-jet to bring the temperature down from 250 °F (121 °C) to 98 °F (37 °C). It is reckoned that the value of property saved by the extinguishing of this fire was £200,000.

=== Lighting ===
He further improved the problematical lighting of theatres which used limelight, with his invention of the Bude-Light. Using a standard flame producer such as an oil lamp and by adding oxygen directly into the flame he produced a dramatically increased bright white light. A system of prisms and lenses distributed light to every room of his Castle house. Bude-Lights were fitted in the House of Commons—where it is said that he replaced 280 candles with three such lamps, which lit the House for sixty years until the arrival of electricity—as well as along Pall Mall and in Trafalgar Square where recently refurbished replicas of the two styles originally used can be seen.

He extended his work to lighthouse lamps, innovating in the choice of source, the use of lenses, and the introduction of identifying on-off patterns enabling seafarers to identify which lighthouse it was they saw flashing.

=== Gurney Stove ===
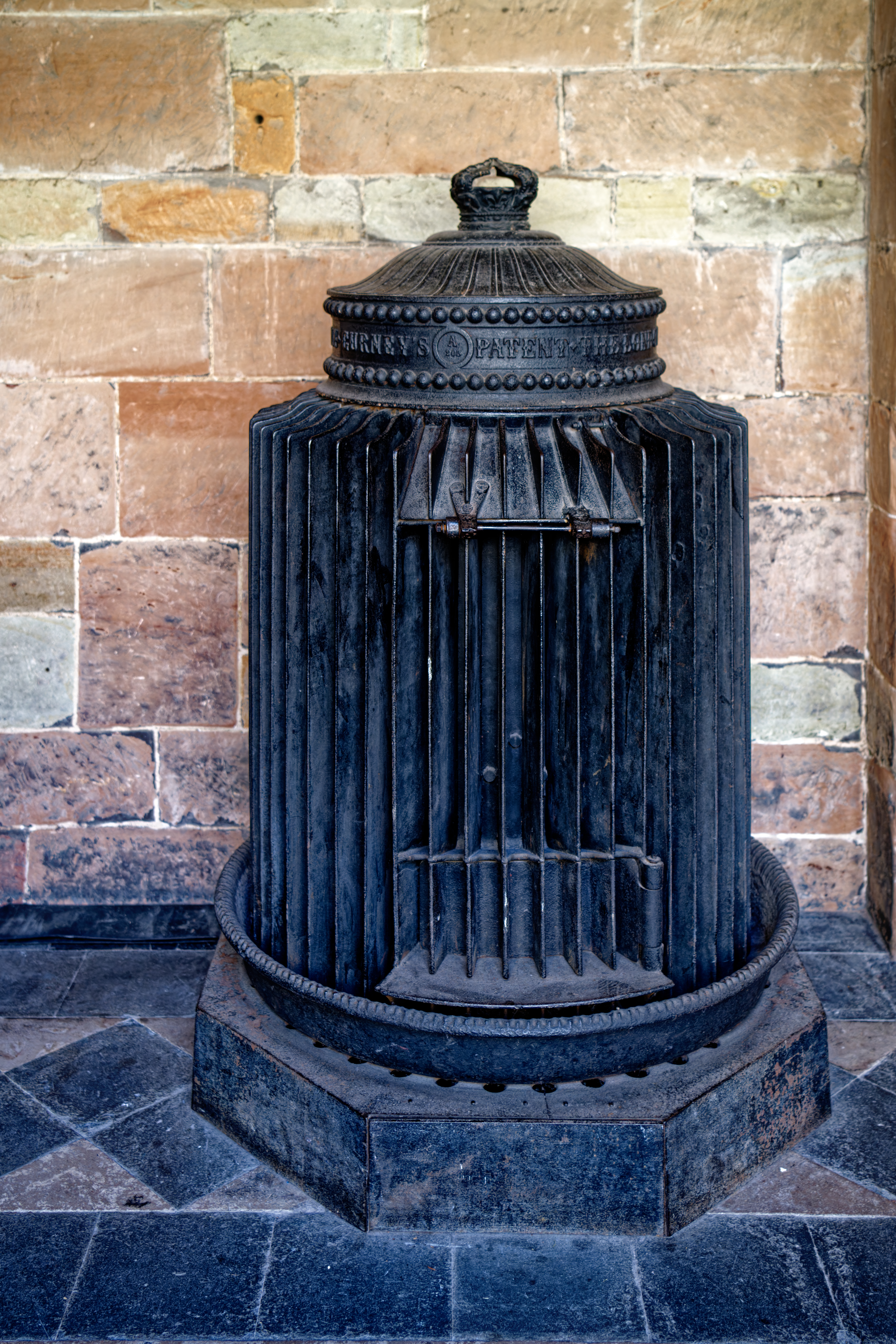
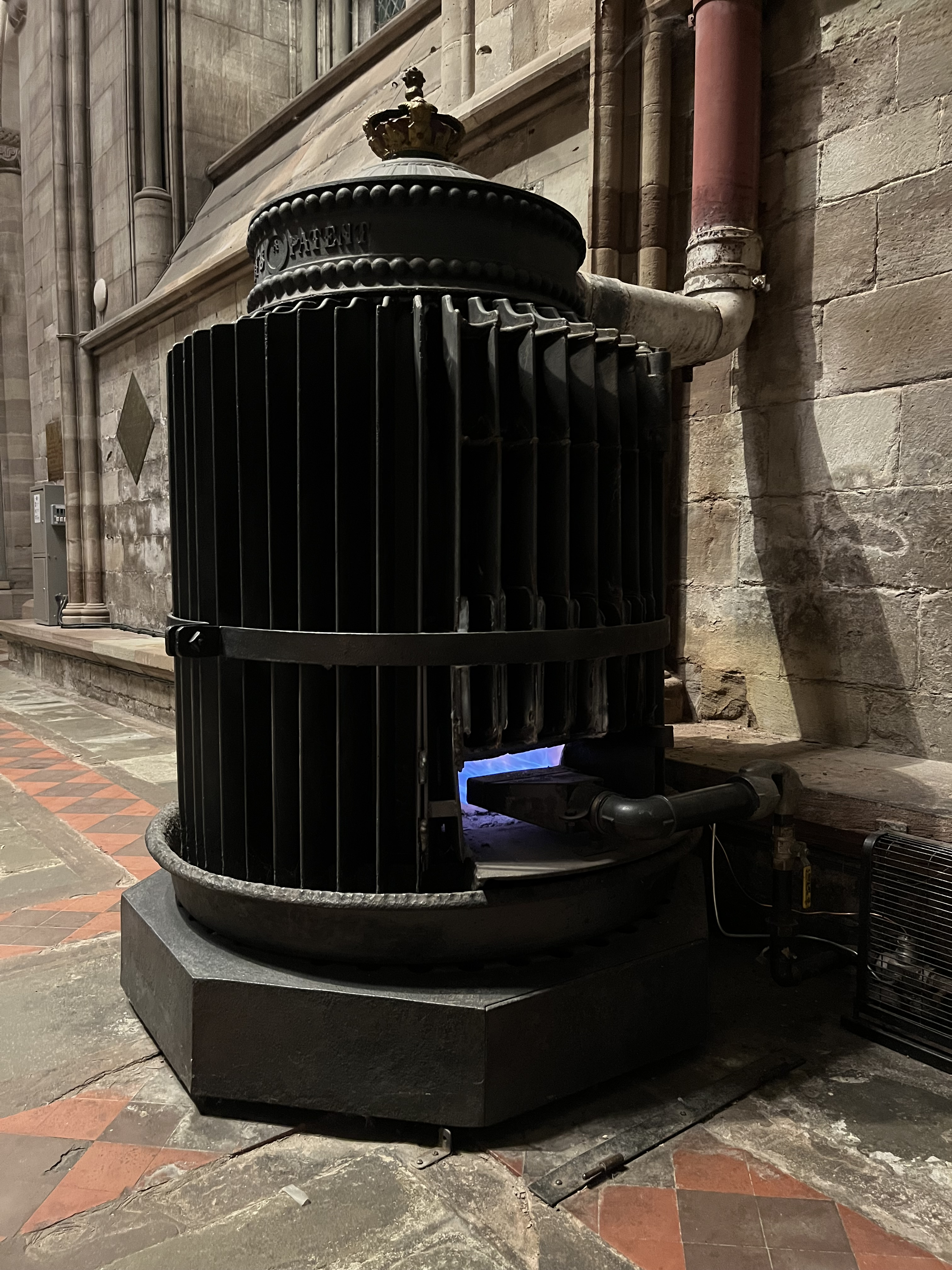
Gurney stoves installed at the Cathedrals in Worcester (left) and Hereford (right). The stove at Hereford Cathedral has been converted to use natural gas.

The Gurney Stove, another invention which he patented in 1856, was extensively used to heat a wide variety of buildings. The stove's most interesting feature is the use of external ribs to increase the surface area of the stove available for heat transfer. A number of these stoves are still in use to this day, in the cathedrals of Ely, Durham, Chester, Hereford and Peterborough, and Tewkesbury Abbey.

== Anna Jane Gurney ==
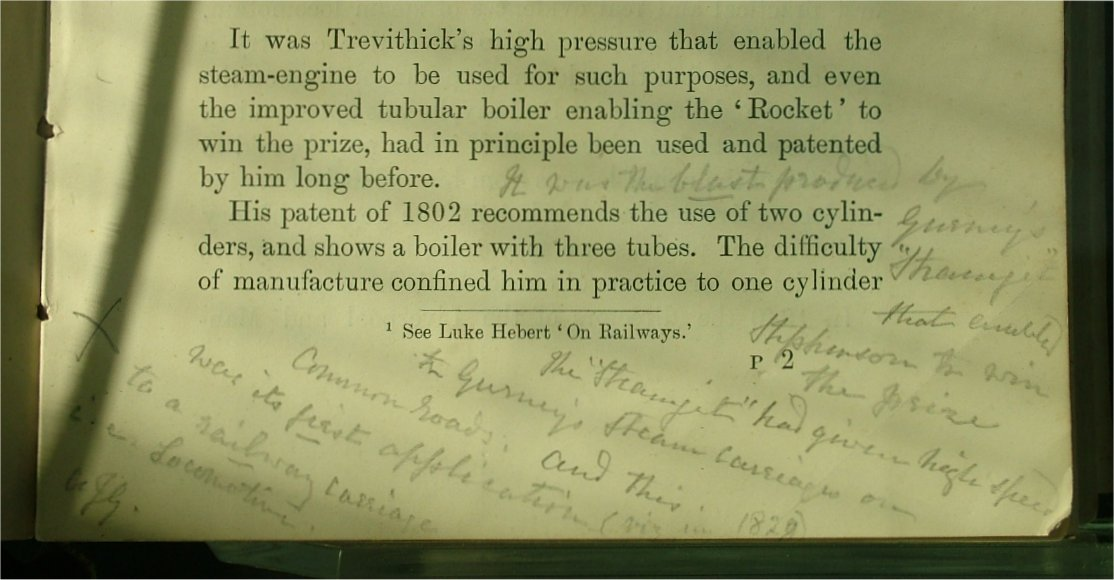
Annotation by Anna Jane Gurney in Trams and Railway Locomotives, specifying that "It was the blast produced by Gurney's "Steamjet" that enabled Stephenson to win the prize. The 'Steamjet' had given high speed to Gurney's steam carriages on common roads. And this was its first application to a railway carriage i.e. Locomotion."

Gurney's daughter Anna Jane appears to have engaged in considerable promotion of her father's claim to various of his inventions; the inscription on his gravestone reads:

To his inventive genius the world is indebted for the high speed of the locomotive, without which railways could not have succeeded and would never have been made.

In her copy of the Dictionary of National Biography, all references to the blowpipe were amended by hand to his blowpipe.

In 1880 she donated £500 to memorialise "his" Steam Jet, at the stone-laying ceremony for Truro Cathedral, somehow managing to rope the children of the then Prince of Wales to present the money. (The Prince of Wales, HRH Prince Albert Edward was timidly asked whether he minded, and replied "Oh, why not? The boys would stand on their heads if she wished."). Anna Jane's subscription read:

In memory of her father Sir Goldsworthy Gurney, inventor of the steam-jet, as a thank offering to almighty God for the benefit of high speed locomotion whereby His good gifts are conveyed from one nation to another and the word of the Lord is sent unto all parts of the world.

A chiming clock presented by her in 1889 to St Olaf's Church, Poughill, in Bude, was inscribed "His inventions and discoveries in steam and electricity rendered transport by land and sea so rapid that it became necessary for all England to keep uniform clock time".

A final Anna Jane tribute was a stained glass window in St. Margaret's, Westminster (destroyed during the Second World War), with an inscription part of which reads:

He originated the Electric Telegraph, High Speed Locomotion and Flashing Light Signalling. He invented the Steam Jet and the Oxy-Hydrogen Blowpipe.

== Publications ==
- Lectures on the Elements of Chemical Science

== See also ==
- Timeline of hydrogen technologies
