= Walter Hancock =

British inventor of steam-powered road vehicles (1799-1852)

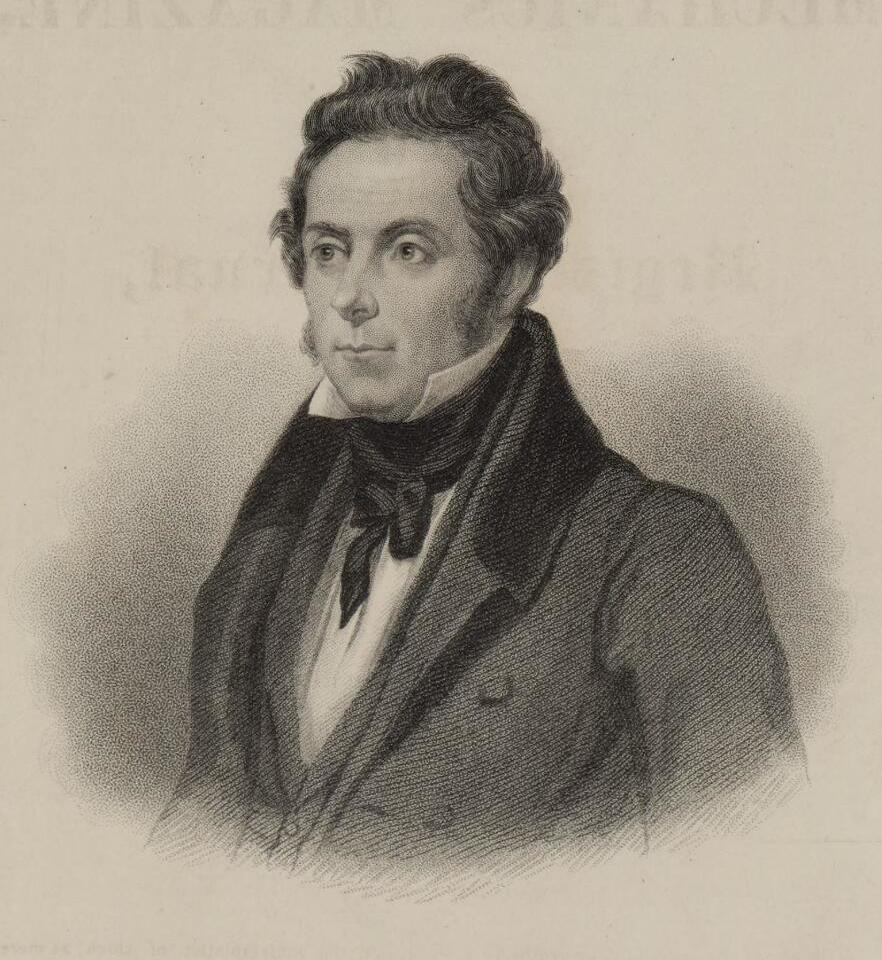
- Born: 16 June 1799; Marlborough, England
- Died: 14 May 1852 (aged 52)
- Engineering career
- Projects: Steam-powered road vehicles

Walter Hancock (16 June 1799 – 14 May 1852) was an English inventor of the Victorian period. He is chiefly remembered for his steam-powered road vehicles, but also received a patent for preparing and cutting natural rubber into sheets. He was the younger brother of Thomas Hancock, the inventor of rubber mastication who is also claimed by some to be the inventor of rubber vulcanization.

== Hancock's steam buses ==
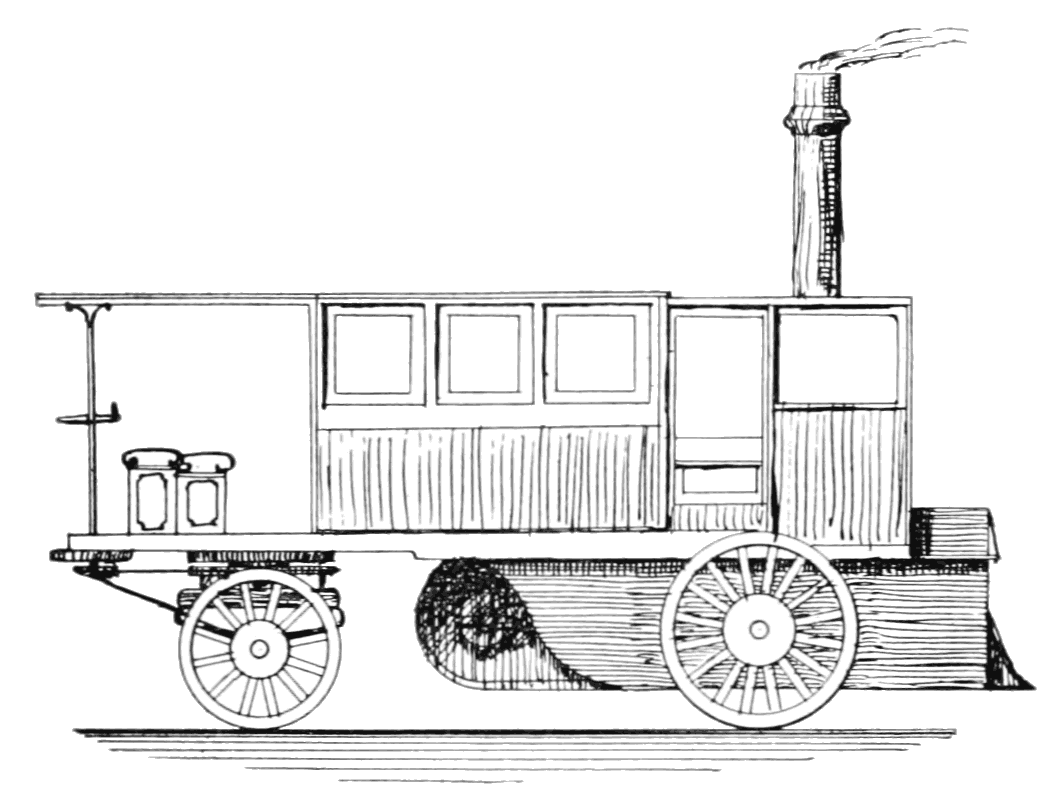
Hancock's steam omnibus Autopsy of 1833, which ran on a regular route between Pentonville and Finsbury Square, London.

Between 1824 and 1836 in Stratford, near London, Hancock constructed a number of steam-powered road vehicles. In 1827 he patented a steam boiler constructed with separate chambers of thin metal which could split rather than explode, a safety measure for operators and passengers. His were not the first road locomotives: experiments by Richard Trevithick occurred a generation earlier with his Puffing Devil and London Steam Carriage; but they were the most successful.

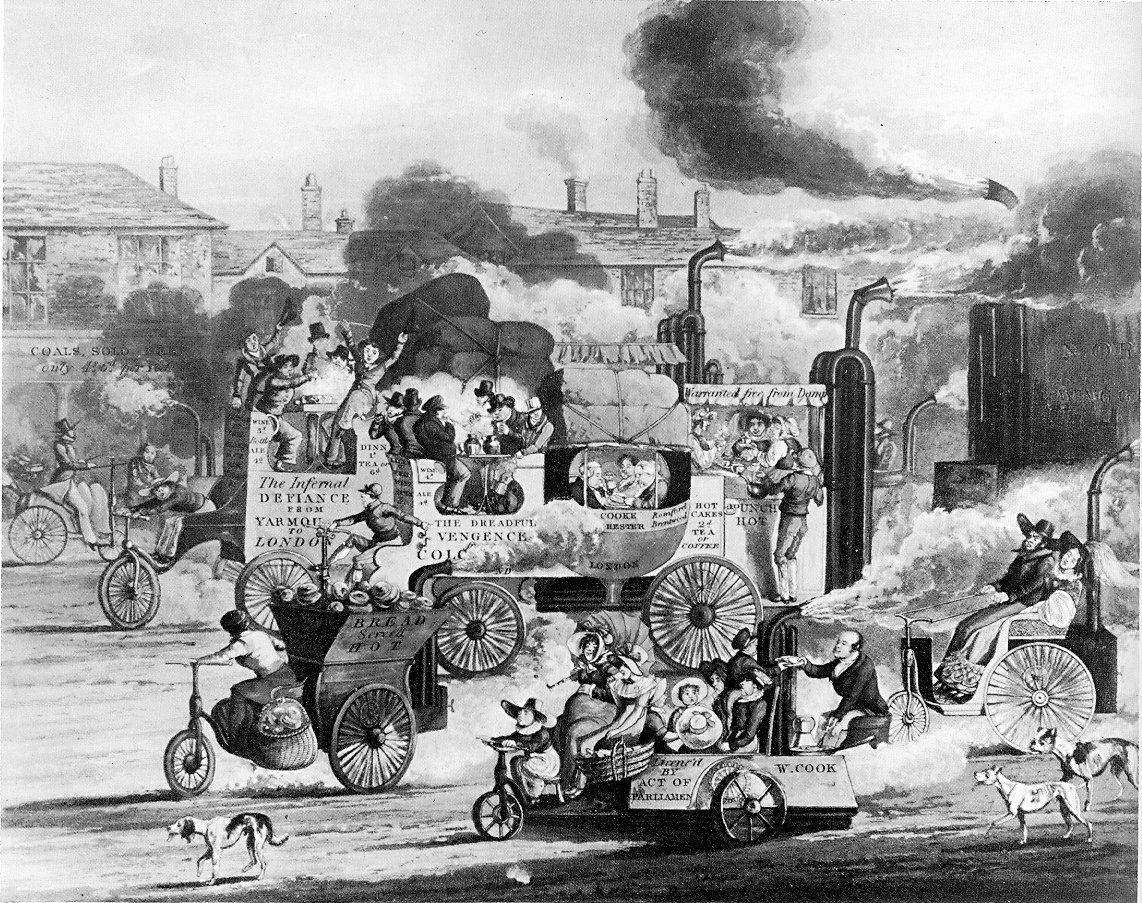
A View in White Chapel Road 1830, one of Alken's satirical Illustrations of Modern Prophecy

This was a period of experimentation and development, with new applications of the steam engine on road and rail. Promoters sought funds for these, keeping them in the public eye and leading satirists to respond with apocalyptic predictions. Hancock's base in Stratford meant that he used Whitechapel Road frequently, so Alken's caricature of 1830 was aimed directly at him.

In 1831, Hancock gave evidence to a Parliamentary select committee on steam carriages.

He built the following vehicles: (Note: There is some uncertainty about Hancock's vehicles. The main source is his Narrative; the uncertainty concerns rebuilds. Hancock states that he built the improved Infant using (the front of) the first Infant. 'Era' began as a two-compartment coach but then reappears as two rows of seats in front of one compartment, Hancock does not explain the change, but its appearance suggests that the front compartment has been replaced by two benches. Worby Beaumont: Motor Vehicles and Motors (1900) p.11 states that Automaton was created from the Drag for Vienna, which Mr Voigtlander never paid for and which Hancock retained.)

1. 1827: tricycle: 4 passengers
2. 1829: first "Infant"; 10-passenger char-a-banc
3. 1831: improved "Infant"; 14-passenger char-a-banc
4. 1832: "Era"; 12-passenger two-compartment coach; the front compartment apparently rebuilt as 8-passenger char-a-banc in 1834; later renamed "Erin"
5. 1833: "Enterprise"; 16-passenger omnibus
6. 1833: "Autopsy"; 12-passenger omnibus
7. 1834: Drag for Mr. Voigtlander of Vienna; 6-passengers on it and 8 in towed carriages; rebuilt in 1836 as
8. 1836: "Automaton"; 16-passenger char-a-banc
9. 1836: first steam phaeton; 3 passengers
10. 1838: second steam phaeton; 3 passengers

=== Hancock's First Carriage ===
Hancock's first carriage of 1827

Hancock's first steam-powered vehicle, around 1827, was a tricycle with twin "donkey engines" over the steered front wheel. He ran the tricycle for hundreds of miles, including trips to Epping Forest, Hounslow and Croydon.

=== "Infant" ===
Hancock's first Infant of 1829

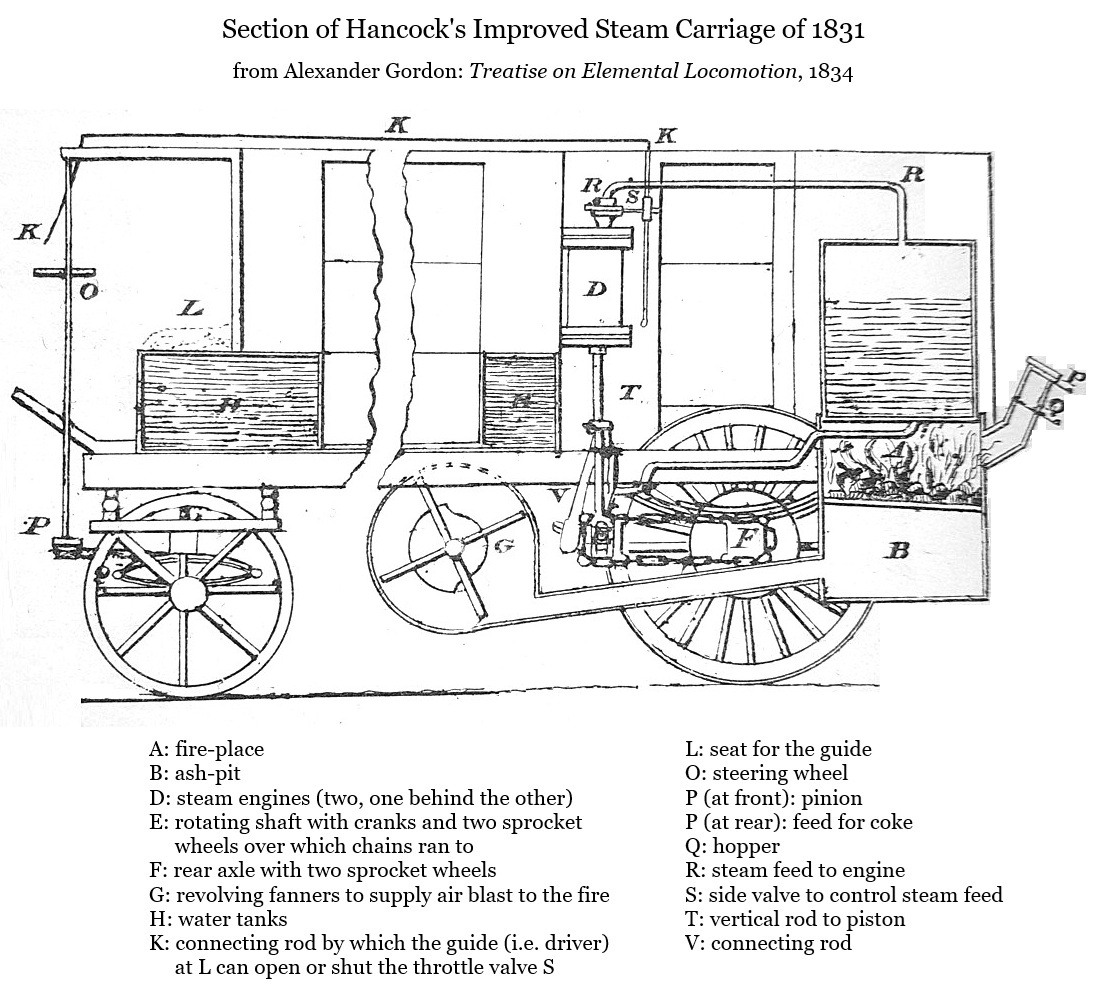
Longitudinal section of Hancock's improved Infant of 1831

In 1829 Hancock built a small 10 seat bus called the Infant. As he rebuilt it in 1831 with 16 seats, the 10-seat version is known as the "the first Infant" (or Infant No. 1) while the 16-seat one is "the improved Infant" (or Infant No. 2) or just "Infant".

In his first Infant, Hancock moved the twin donkey-engines to the back, with chain drive to the rear axle. The ability of steam road vehicles to ascend hills driven only by their wheels had long been doubted. Hancock demonstrated that "propellers" (mechanical feet) were unnecessary by successfully ascending a frozen Pentonville Road (gradient 5 degrees) when horse-drawn coaches were struggling.

Hancock found it impossible, however, to keep the engine clean in its proximity to the boiler. In 1831, therefore, he built an improved Infant with 16 seats. He now placed a larger two-cylinder engine vertically, immediately behind the passenger compartment, with a separate compartment for the engineer between the engine and the boiler. The cross-section shows where he placed the water tanks: beneath the seats. With this bus he began a regular service between Stratford and central London and, on 31 October 1832, made an experimental trip to Brighton.

=== "Enterprise" ===
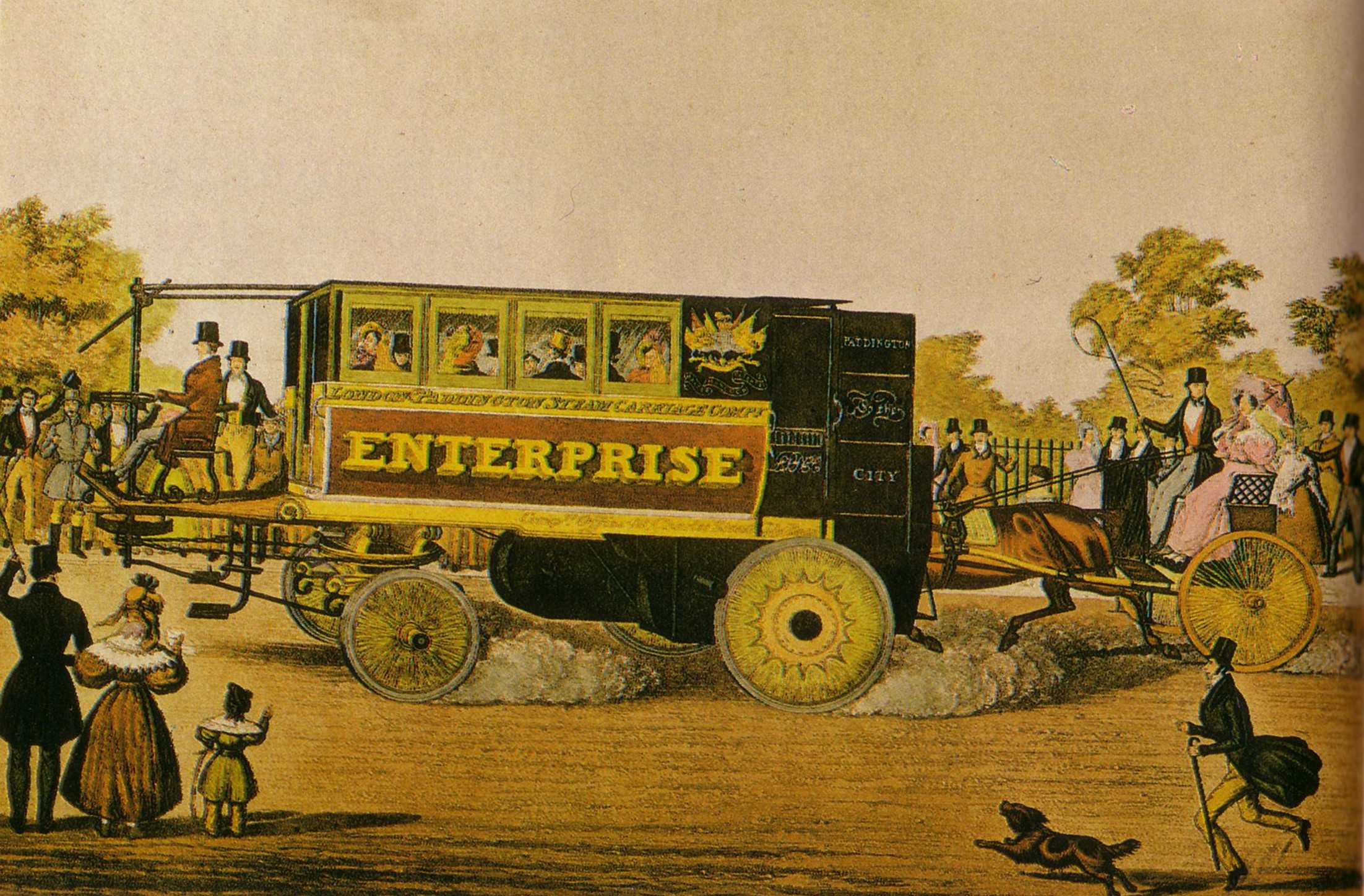
The Enterprise

On 22 April 1833 Hancock's steam omnibus Enterprise (built for the London and Paddington Steam Carriage Company) began a regular service between London Wall and Paddington via Islington. It was the first regular steam carriage service, and was the first mechanically propelled vehicle specially designed for omnibus work to be operated. During this vehicle's construction in 1832, a negligent engineer “died of fright” when a boiler component tore, expelling high-pressure steam in his direction. Neither he nor anyone else present was physically injured in any way, and the machinery itself suffered no significant damage.

The Enterprise had several features which were innovative by contemporary standards. The engine was suspended on leaf springs along with the body of the vehicle, and the axle located with swinging arms as is still done today in most pickup trucks, with power being transmitted to the axle using chain drive. The rear axle was also used to drive a centrifugal blower fan which was used to force air into the firebox.

The Enterprise required three operators in normal running. The driver sat at the front and was responsible for steering (via a steering wheel rather than a tiller) and controlling the speed via a regulator. A second operator occupied a small compartment to the rear of the vehicle between the boiler and the engine, this man was responsible for looking after the boiler's water level and selecting reverse gear when required. The final man stood on a platform at the rear and was responsible for maintaining the fire and braking, which was carried out by means of a large lever which acted directly on one of the rear wheels. Nothing is known about how these three people communicated.

The service was brought to an end due to a dispute between Hancock and the operators, and Hancock himself built and operated further steam buses between 1833 and 1840, with names like Era I, Era II and Autopsy (Note: Until the mid-nneteenth century the word "autopsy" meant something one saw for oneself or a visual demonstration. That meaning has fallen out of use. Hancock was inviting sceptics to see for themselves that his steam omnibus really worked.) and a towing vehicle, German drag.

=== "Automaton" ===
The "Automaton" of 1836

In 1836 Hancock introduced the 22 seat Automaton, which ran over 700 journeys between London and Paddington, London and Islington, and Moorgate and Stratford, carrying over 12,000 passengers in total and regularly travelling at 12 to 15 miles per hour, with a top speed in excess of 20 mph.

Writing in 1902, Moore averred Automaton the best steam omnibus ever built, but observed that as interest in it waned on one route, Hancock put it to service on another. When breakdowns occurred, the delay was far longer than the minute or two when a horse fell. Hancock withdrew it in 1840 when the enforcement of the Turnpike Acts in London gave him the opportunity to pose as the victim of circumstances beyond his control.

=== Statistics ===
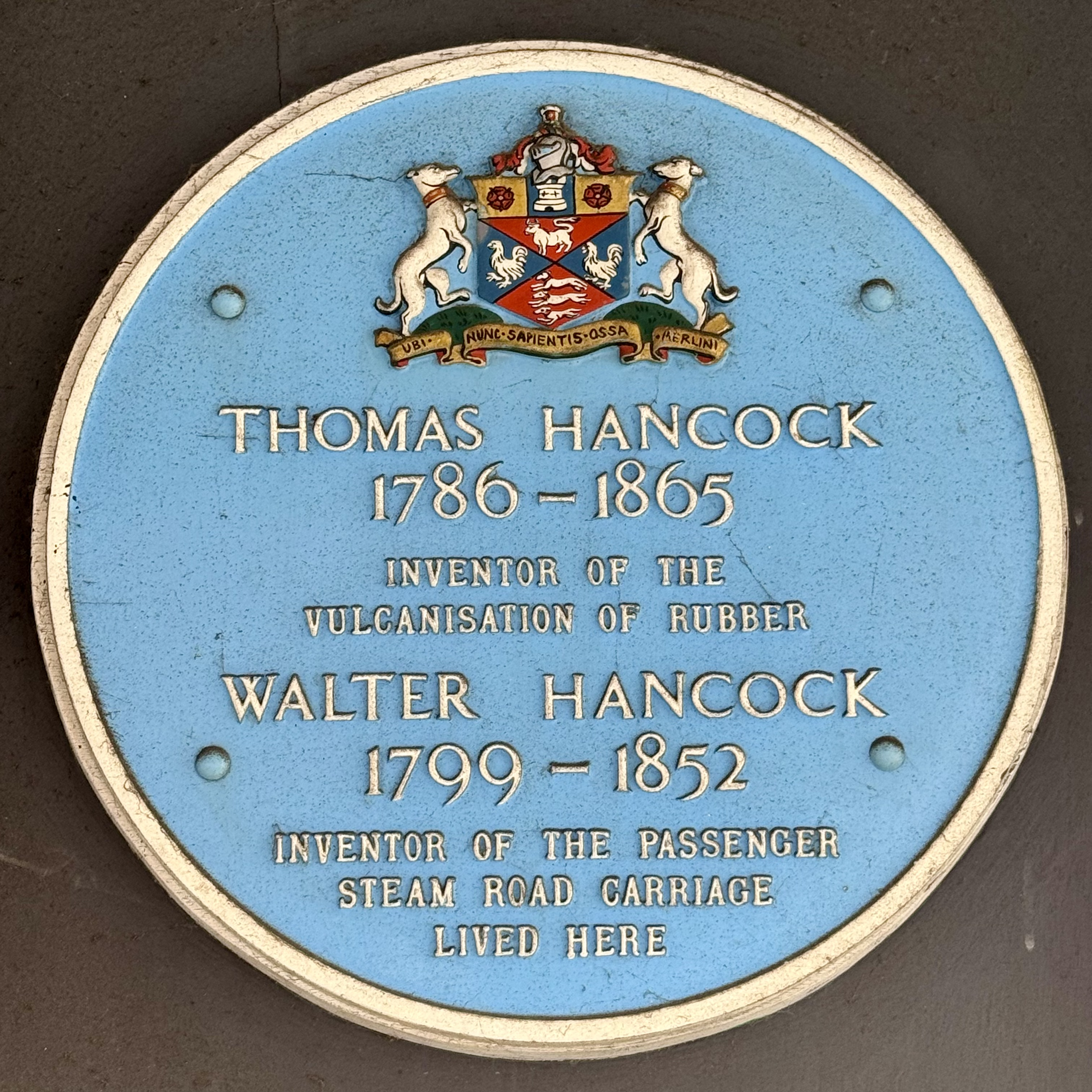
Blue plaque at no.4 High Street, Marlborough for Walter and elder brother Thomas

Hancock compiled some statistics of his bus operations. Over a total distance of 4,200 mi (6,800 km), he had carried 12,761 passengers. He had made 143 round trips from the city to Paddington, 525 trips from the city to Islington, and 44 to Stratford. 55 chaldrons of coke fuel were used (roughly 165 tons), equalling 76 mi (122 km) per chaldron; at 12s (60p) per chaldron, this equalled 2d per mile. Hancock's statistics also included the hours in service each day, which averaged 5 hrs 17 mins per vehicle, while the average time taken to make the 9 mi (14 km) round trip from Moorgate to Paddington was 1 hr 10 mins.

== Steam car ==
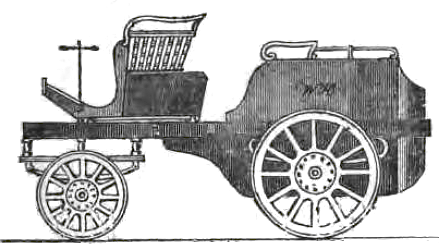
Walter Hancock's Steam Phaeton of 1836 (from his Narrative)

Longitudinal section of Hancock's steam car of 1838 (from Mechanics Magazine of 7 Sep 1838)

In 1836 and 1838 Hancock built two steam carriages for his own use. That of 1838 was the more successful. He refers to the design as a phaeton, but others called it a gig. As it was a mechanised personal vehicle, the term "car" seems appropriate.

In a postscript of 1838 to his Narrative (which was written in 1836 but not published until 1838), Hancock writes with pride of his Steam Phaeton, which had seats for three, as well as the driver. As the steering pivot was central, there must have been a single seat at the front for the driver with three on the bench behind. The longitudinal section shows the arrangement of parts. This conformed to that of his later buses, except that there was no roof and there was no separate place for the stoker behind the boiler; presumably one man worked in the area between the vertical cylinders and the boiler as both engineer and stoker.

Hancock writes that its usual speed was 10 - 12 mph, but that he had done 20 mph in it. There are reports from the summer of 1838 of his taking it to the City and the West End with friends, showing off outside the Bank of England and Guildhall and spending several hours in Hyde Park where "it made several turns within its own length" and "from the slight noise it made, the horses passing it did not appear to be frightened".

Its ability to turn in its own length implies that, as with other steam road vehicles of this date, drive was normally taken to a single rear wheel with the clutch on the other rear wheel engaged only when needed, i.e. over loose surfaces or going up or down steep hills. (Note: In his evidence to the Parliamentary Select Committee in 1831, Goldsworthy Gurney ascribed his steam coach's having run away and crashed when descending Highgate West Hill (gradient 7 per cent) to a failure to engage the second wheel for the descent; it had ascended using drive to one wheel only.) Another report says that the rear axle was hung on springs (presumably with a trailing arm from the crankshaft to maintain tension in the chain), so there was full suspension.

== Demise of steam-powered road passenger vehicles ==
By 1840, the development of steam-powered road vehicles had lost impetus and the heavy road tolls imposed by the Turnpike Acts had turned inventors away from steam power, except on rails. Hancock was forced to give up the struggle, and the way was left clear for the operators of horse-drawn buses.

Hancock continued working with steam and supplied a light engine (similar to his steam road coaches) to the Eastern Counties Railway.

== See also ==
- History of steam road vehicles
