= Charles Webb Dance =

British Army officer and motor enthusiast

Sir Charles Webb Dance KH
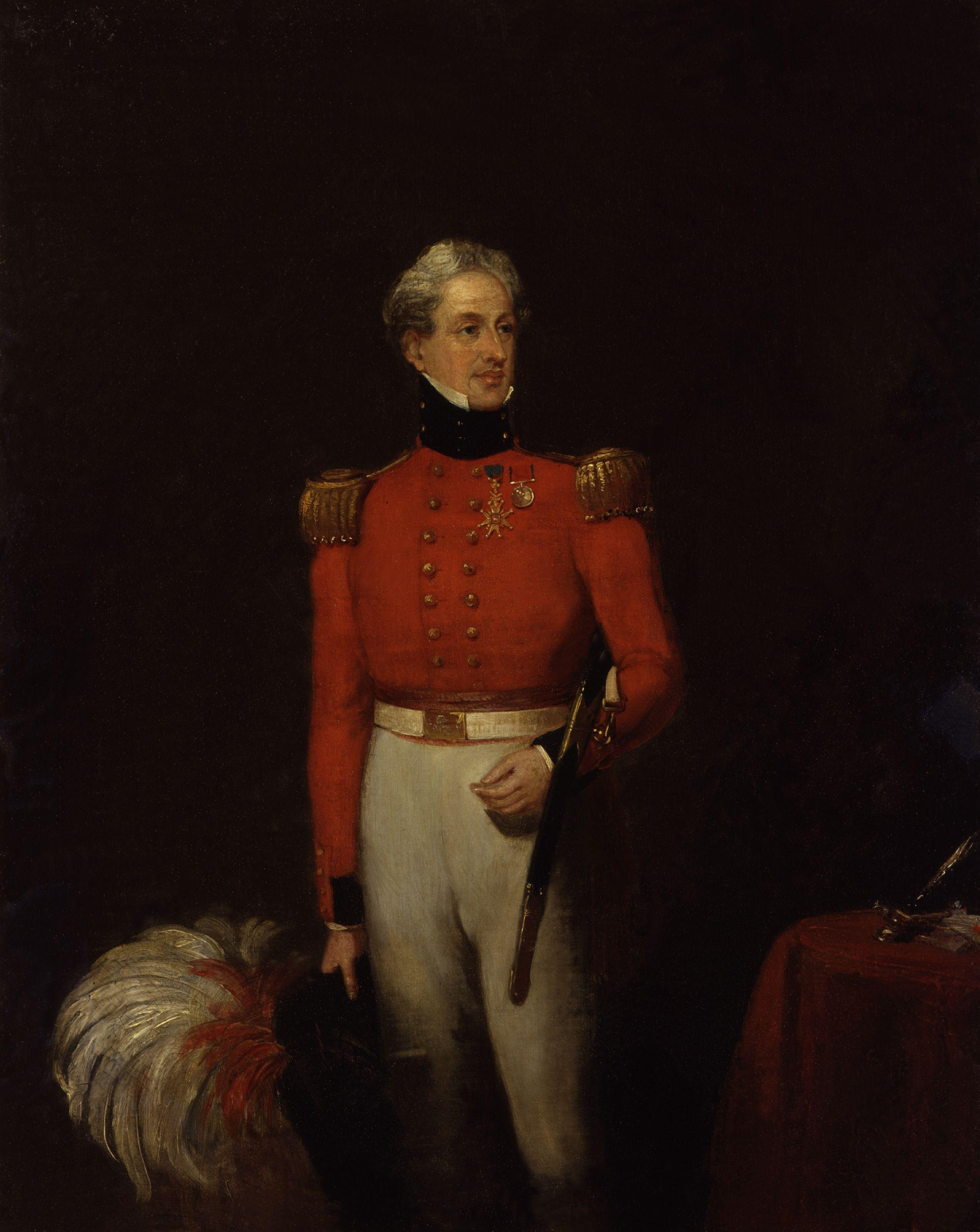
- Portrait by William Salter
- Born: 1785
- Died: 13 November 1844 (aged 58–59); Bishop's Hull, Somerset
- Military career
- Allegiance: United Kingdom
- Branch: British Army
- Service years: 1804–1822
- Rank: Colonel
- Units: 23rd Light Dragoons; 2nd Life Guards
- Conflicts: Napoleonic Wars; Peninsular War; Battle of Talavera; Hundred Days; Battle of Waterloo (WIA)
- Memorials: St Peter and St Paul Church, Taunton

Colonel Sir Charles Webb Dance KH (1785 – 13 November 1844) was a British Army officer during the Napoleonic Wars and a pioneer of motoring in the first third of the 19th century. An enthusiastic motorist, he did a great deal to encourage engineers who were engaged in the invention and development of steam road vehicles.

He was the second son of George Dance the Younger and his wife, Mary Gurnell. His paternal grandfather was George Dance the Elder and his uncles included James Love, and Sir Nathaniel Dance-Holland. Nathaniel Smith was both an uncle and cousin once removed. His cousins included William Dance and Sir Nathaniel Dance.

== Biography ==
In May 1802, at the end of his school days, Dance went to Brasenose College, Oxford. However, he only stayed a year. It was apparent that an academic life did not suit him.

In July 1803, Dance joined the 3rd Dragoon Guards. He served under the Duke of Wellington in Portugal and Spain, and later in France and Belgium. He distinguished himself at the Battle of Talavera, where his horse was shot from under him and Dance was nearly killed as a bullet passed through the bearskin on his helmet but missed his head. After Talavera, the regiment returned to England but Dance remained in Portugal and commanded two squadrons of Portuguese Cavalry under General William Beresford.

In 1811, Dance was recalled to England to be transferred to the 23rd Light Dragoons. He was subsequently wounded at the Battle of Waterloo, whilst serving as a Captain in the Light Dragoons. In a letter to his father, Dance described his own wounds as “slight cuts to the flesh”.

In early 1809 Dance fought a duel with a lieutenant from the same Regiment who had challenged him. Each duellist fired seven times; Dance’ seventh shot hit the lieutenant in the groin. The lieutenant recovered within a month. Dance’s conduct was ‘much approved’ by the Senior Officers.

On return to England in 1816, Dance was appointed Major (24 July 1816) and Lieutenant -Colonel (27 March 1817) of the 2nd Life Guards. Later, during Earl Whitworth’s government in Ireland, Dance was appointed his aide-de-camp.

Dance held the silver stick at the coronation of George IV and was knighted on that occasion, 25 July 1821. In 1836, he was created a Knight of the Royal Guelphic Order.

In August 1822 Dance retired from the army on half pay.

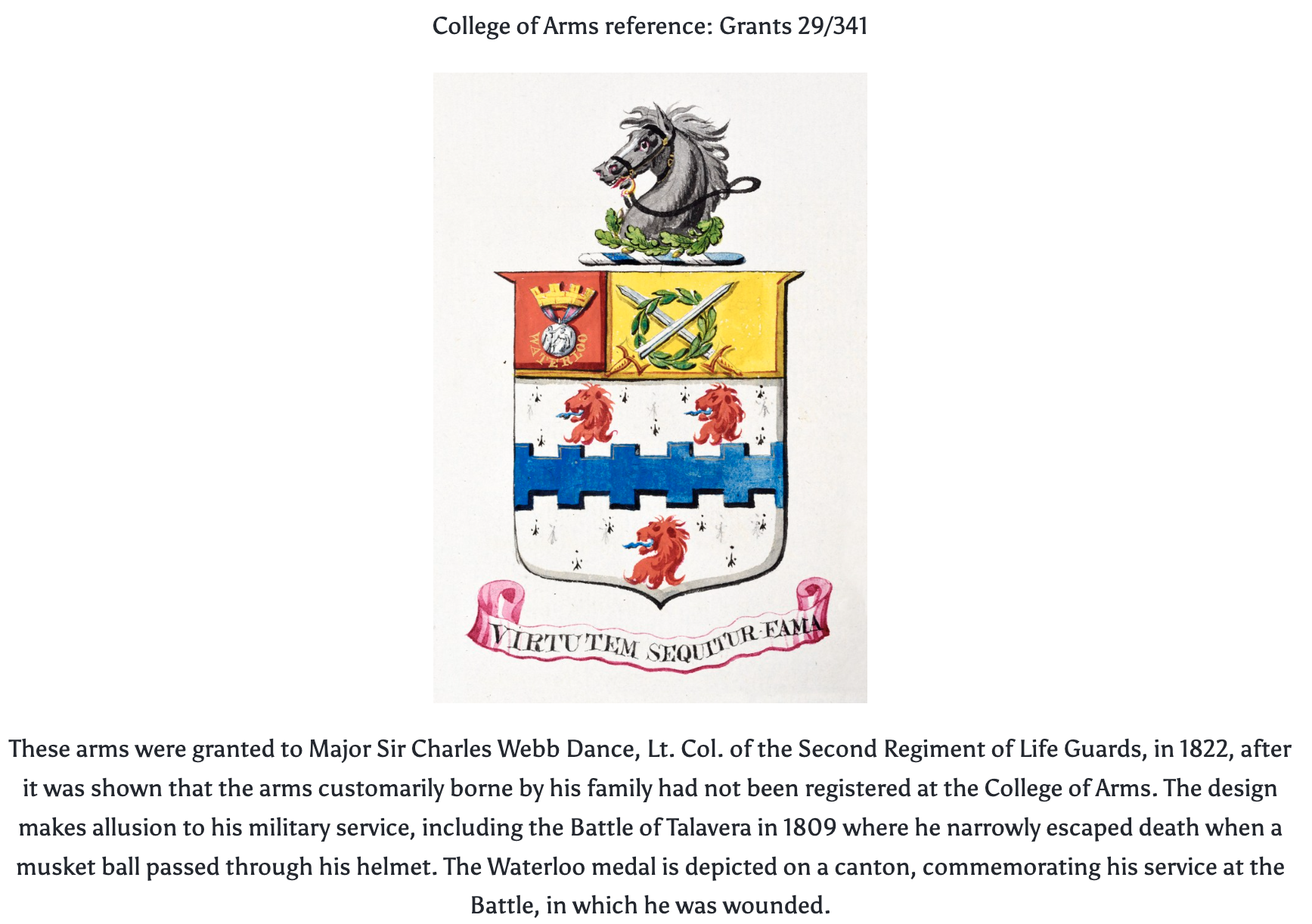
Sir Charles Webb Dance College of Arms

His commissions were dated:

• Ensign 7 September 1804

• Lieutenant 5 September 1805

• Captain in 23rd Regiment of Light Dragoons, 9 April 1807

• Major (Army) 20 June 1816 and Major 2nd Life Guards 24 July 1816

• Lieutenant Colonel (Army) 27 March 1817 and Major and Lieutenant Colonel 2nd Life Guards 27 March 1817

• Colonel 10 Jan 1837

=== Family life ===
In 1805, Dance was besotted with Eliza Scott Evans an adventuress who was then deporting herself for a part of each evening as a Columbine in Ashley’s Theatre . Dance married her in haste on 28 July 1805 without his father’s knowledge. Dance soon discovered his mistake and her continuing association with other men forced him to leave her. Divorce proceedings were concluded in spring of 1812. Eliza died shortly thereafter.

Dance may have had a son, George, by a Susan Griggs in late 1812. Nothing further is known of mother or son.

Finally on 17 December 1816, at St Pancras Parish Church, Middlesex, England, Dance married Isabella Anne Cooper, who was born in 1796. Her father was Allan Cooper, a Captain in the army of the East India Company. Together they had four sons and five daughters.

=== Support for steam carriages ===
Dance is best known for his activities in 1831-33 running a steam carriage service between Cheltenham and Gloucester using carriages built for him by Goldsworthy Gurney. This came to an untimely end through local opposition and sabotage but, undeterred, he then worked with a leading engineer, Joshua Field, to improve the technology. With his improved carriage he ran demonstration services for four weeks from London to Brighton and then for two weeks between London and Greenwich before retiring.

His activities do not fit the pattern of an entrepreneur or a gentleman amateur and there have long been suspicions that there was more to his activities than met the eye. This is confirmed by a minute of a meeting of 40 MPs, peers and other gentlemen convened in Westminster on April 23, 1833 to establish a Society for Promoting the Application of Steam to General Transport and Agricultural Purposes. Dance was the first person asked to speak and told the meeting that:

... several years ago he had been induced to consider the application of Steam to locomotive purposes as important to the military operations of the country, and had subsequently embarked capital in Mr Gurney's experiments ... He was happy to find so many honourable gentlemen coming forward to promote what he considered to be a great national undertaking ... that really no private means could bring forward the thing with justice either to itself or the projector; but that, if supported as it was entitled to be, and as he now hoped it would be, by the country, he had not a single doubt that it would succeed fully.

On 12 August 1829, Dance was one of a party including the Duke of Wellington (then the Prime Minister) who witnessed, at Cavalry Barrack Yard, Hounslow, the operation by Goldsworthy Gurney of the latter’s steam drag. It pulled a variety of loads at speeds up to 17 miles an hour.

By October 1830, Dance was reported as having the principal interest in a patent relating to steam coaches and to be in Cheltenham for the purpose of making arrangements there for a steam coach service. Gurney built him three identical steam drags, with which in February 1831 he started an omnibus service running four times a day between Cheltenham and Gloucester. The trustees of one of the roads on which the carriage travelled covered part of the road with gravel in an attempt to stop the carriage. Dance ran Gurney's coaches on the road between Cheltenham and Gloucester until public opposition compelled his withdrawal.

After ceasing his services on the Cheltenham to Gloucester road, he was a joint patentee with Joshua Field of an improved boiler. This was incorporated in one of Gurney's steam drags and used on Friday 23 August 1833 to draw an open carriage bearing Dance accompanied by several gentlemen from London to Brighton. The party started at 11 am and took 3 hrs 26 minutes to travel 34 miles.

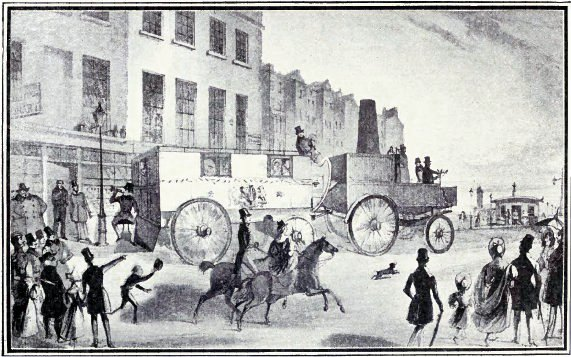
Sir Charles Dance's steam carriage leaving London for Brighton, 1833

From September 1833, he used the drag with an omnibus attached, to run a service between London and Brighton, attaining a peak speed of sixteen miles per hour.

On the first trip from London to Brighton, fifteen passengers were carried and the distance of fifty-two miles (84 km) was covered in five and a half hours, the return journey completed in less than five hours.The coach ran every day from the Strand, London, to Brighton. This consisted of an engine mounted on four wheels with a tall rectangular funnel that narrowed towards the top. Above the engine were seats for six or seven persons in addition to the driver. On the roof there were places for four passengers, and on a board behind stood footmen. The carriage was one of the spectacular sights of London at that time and great crowds gathered in the Strand every day to witness its departure.

At the middle of October the steam drag and omnibus were put on the road between Wellington Street, Waterloo Bridge and Greenwich, where it continued to run for a fortnight, with a view of showing the public in London what could be done in this direction. The proprietor had no intention of making it a permanent mode of conveyance, and therefore kept the company as select as he could by charging half a crown for tickets each way.

=== Death ===
Dance died on 13 November 1844, aged 58, at his residence, Barr House, Bishop’s Hull, Somerset after a long illness. He was survived by his widow, son George born 1818, daughters Isabella Matilda born 1822 and Marianne born 1828.
