= List of United Kingdom locations: Bur-Bz =

The United Kingdom

This is part of the list of United Kingdom locations: a gazetteer of place names in the United Kingdom showing each place's locality and geographical coordinates.

== Bu (continued) ==
=== Bur ===
==== Burb-Burd ====
Location	Locality	Coordinates (links to map & photo sources)	OS grid reference
Burbage	Leicestershire	52.52°N 01.35°W	SP4492
Burbage	Wiltshire	51.34°N 01.67°W	SU2361
Burbage	Derbyshire	53.24°N 01.94°W	SK0472
Burcher	Herefordshire	52.23°N 02.98°W	SO3360
Burchett's Green	Berkshire	51.52°N 00.80°W	SU8381
Burcombe	Wiltshire	51.06°N 01.90°W	SU0730
Burcot	Worcestershire	52.33°N 02.03°W	SO9871
Burcot	Oxfordshire	51.65°N 01.19°W	SU5695
Burcote	Shropshire	52.55°N 02.38°W	SO7495
Burcott	Somerset	51.20°N 02.68°W	ST5245
Burcott (Bierton)	Buckinghamshire	51.82°N 00.78°W	SP8415
Burcott (Wing)	Buckinghamshire	51.89°N 00.73°W	SP8723
Burdiehouse	City of Edinburgh	55.89°N 03.16°W	NT2767
Burdon	Sunderland	54.85°N 01.40°W	NZ3851
Burdonshill	The Vale Of Glamorgan	51.43°N 03.28°W	ST1171
Burdrop	Oxfordshire	52.03°N 01.49°W	SP3537

==== Bure-Burh ====
Location	Locality	Coordinates (links to map & photo sources)	OS grid reference
Bures	Essex	51.97°N 00.76°E	TL9034
Bures Green	Suffolk	51.98°N 00.78°E	TL9135
Burford	Devon	50.97°N 04.42°W	SS3022
Burford	Somerset	51.16°N 02.58°W	ST5941
Burford	Shropshire	52.30°N 02.61°W	SO5868
Burford	Oxfordshire	51.80°N 01.63°W	SP2512
Burford	Cheshire	53.07°N 02.56°W	SJ6253
Burgate	Suffolk	52.33°N 01.05°E	TM0875
Burgates	Hampshire	51.04°N 00.90°W	SU7728
Burgedin	Powys	52.71°N 03.12°W	SJ2414
Burge End	Hertfordshire	51.97°N 00.34°W	TL1432
Burgess Hill	West Sussex	50.95°N 00.13°W	TQ3119
Burgh	Suffolk	52.11°N 01.25°E	TM2351
Burgh by Sands	Cumbria	54.92°N 03.06°W	NY3259
Burgh Castle	Norfolk	52.57°N 01.65°E	TG4804
Burghclere	Hampshire	51.34°N 01.32°W	SU4761
Burghclere Common	Hampshire	51.35°N 01.32°W	SU4762
Burgh Common	Norfolk	52.50°N 01.03°E	TM0694
Burghead	Moray	57.70°N 03.49°W	NJ1169
Burghfield	Berkshire	51.40°N 01.05°W	SU6668
Burghfield Common	Berkshire	51.38°N 01.06°W	SU6566
Burghfield Hill	Berkshire	51.39°N 01.06°W	SU6567
Burgh Heath	Surrey	51.29°N 00.22°W	TQ2457
Burgh Hill (Hurst Green)	East Sussex	51.00°N 00.45°E	TQ7226
Burgh Hill (Chiddingly)	East Sussex	50.88°N 00.18°E	TQ5412
Burghill	Herefordshire	52.09°N 02.77°W	SO4744
Burgh le Marsh	Lincolnshire	53.15°N 00.24°E	TF5064
Burgh Muir	Aberdeenshire	57.23°N 02.38°W	NJ7716
Burgh next Aylsham	Norfolk	52.77°N 01.29°E	TG2225
Burgh on Bain	Lincolnshire	53.35°N 00.16°W	TF2286
Burgh St Margaret	Norfolk	52.66°N 01.60°E	TG4414
Burgh St Peter	Norfolk	52.47°N 01.62°E	TM4693
Burgh Stubbs	Norfolk	52.86°N 01.02°E	TG0434
Burghwallis	Doncaster	53.59°N 01.20°W	SE5311
Burgois	Cornwall	50.51°N 04.93°W	SW9272
Burham	Kent	51.33°N 00.46°E	TQ7262
Burham Court	Kent	51.33°N 00.45°E	TQ7162

==== Buri-Burn ====
Location	Locality	Coordinates (links to map & photo sources)	OS grid reference
Buriton	Hampshire	50.97°N 00.96°W	SU7320
Burland	Shetland Islands	60.11°N 01.30°W	HU3937
Burland	Cheshire	53.07°N 02.58°W	SJ6153
Burlawn	Cornwall	50.49°N 04.83°W	SW9970
Burleigh	Gloucestershire	51.70°N 02.20°W	SO8601
Burlescombe	Devon	50.93°N 03.32°W	ST0716
Burleston	Dorset	50.74°N 02.32°W	SY7794
Burlestone	Devon	50.32°N 03.65°W	SX8248
Burley	Hampshire	50.82°N 01.70°W	SU2103
Burley	Leeds	53.80°N 01.59°W	SE2734
Burley	Rutland	52.68°N 00.69°W	SK8810
Burley	Shropshire	52.42°N 02.78°W	SO4781
Burley Beacon	Hampshire	50.81°N 01.71°W	SU2002
Burleydam	Cheshire	52.97°N 02.59°W	SJ6042
Burley Gate	Herefordshire	52.12°N 02.60°W	SO5947
Burley in Wharfedale	Bradford	53.91°N 01.75°W	SE1646
Burley Lawn	Hampshire	50.82°N 01.68°W	SU2203
Burley Street	Hampshire	50.83°N 01.71°W	SU2004
Burley Woodhead	Bradford	53.89°N 01.77°W	SE1544
Burlinch	Somerset	51.05°N 03.05°W	ST2629
Burlingham Green	Norfolk	52.63°N 01.48°E	TG3610
Burlingjobb	Powys	52.21°N 03.09°W	SO2558
Burlish Park	Worcestershire	52.34°N 02.29°W	SO8072
Burlorne Tregoose	Cornwall	50.48°N 04.80°W	SX0169
Burlow	East Sussex	50.92°N 00.23°E	TQ5716
Burlton	Shropshire	52.82°N 02.81°W	SJ4526
Burmantofts	Leeds	53.80°N 01.51°W	SE3234
Burmarsh	Kent	51.04°N 00.99°E	TR1031
Burmarsh	Herefordshire	52.11°N 02.68°W	SO5346
Burmington	Warwickshire	52.03°N 01.62°W	SP2637
Burn	North Yorkshire	53.74°N 01.10°W	SE5928
Burnage	Manchester	53.42°N 02.21°W	SJ8692
Burnard's Ho	Devon	50.81°N 04.40°W	SS3104
Burnaston	Derbyshire	52.88°N 01.58°W	SK2832
Burnbank	South Lanarkshire	55.78°N 04.07°W	NS7056
Burn Bridge	North Yorkshire	53.95°N 01.54°W	SE3051
Burnby	East Riding of Yorkshire	53.90°N 00.73°W	SE8346
Burncross	Sheffield	53.46°N 01.48°W	SK3496
Burndell	West Sussex	50.80°N 00.61°W	SU9802
Burnden	Bolton	53.55°N 02.40°W	SD7307
Burnedge	Oldham	53.58°N 02.12°W	SD9210
Burneside	Cumbria	54.34°N 02.77°W	SD5095
Burness	Orkney Islands	59.28°N 02.59°W	HY6644
Burneston	North Yorkshire	54.26°N 01.54°W	SE3085
Burnett	Bath and North East Somerset	51.38°N 02.49°W	ST6665
Burnfoot	Scottish Borders	55.43°N 02.77°W	NT5116
Burnfoot	East Ayrshire	55.35°N 04.49°W	NS4209
Burnfoot	Dumfries and Galloway	55.05°N 03.17°W	NY2574
Burnfoot	North Lanarkshire	55.87°N 03.99°W	NS7566
Burngreave	Sheffield	53.38°N 01.47°W	SK3588
Burnham	Buckinghamshire	51.52°N 00.67°W	SU9282
Burnham	North Lincolnshire	53.63°N 00.41°W	TA0517
Burnham Deepdale	Norfolk	52.96°N 00.67°E	TF8044
Burnham Green	Hertfordshire	51.82°N 00.17°W	TL2616
Burnham Market	Norfolk	52.94°N 00.72°E	TF8342
Burnham Norton	Norfolk	52.95°N 00.70°E	TF8243
Burnham-on-Crouch	Essex	51.62°N 00.81°E	TQ9596
Burnham-on-Sea	Somerset	51.23°N 03.00°W	ST3049
Burnham Overy Staithe	Norfolk	52.96°N 00.73°E	TF8444
Burnham Overy Town	Norfolk	52.94°N 00.73°E	TF8442
Burnham Thorpe	Norfolk	52.93°N 00.75°E	TF8541
Burnhead	South Ayrshire	55.26°N 04.80°W	NS2200
Burnhead	Scottish Borders	55.43°N 02.77°W	NT5116
Burnhead (Allanton)	Dumfries and Galloway	55.13°N 03.71°W	NX9184
Burnhead (Thornhill)	Dumfries and Galloway	55.23°N 03.79°W	NX8695
Burnhead	Aberdeenshire	57.02°N 02.23°W	NO8693
Burnhill Green	Staffordshire	52.59°N 02.32°W	SJ7800
Burnhope	Durham	54.82°N 01.72°W	NZ1848
Burnhouse	North Ayrshire	55.71°N 04.58°W	NS3850
Burnhouse Mains	Scottish Borders	55.73°N 02.89°W	NT4449
Burniere	Cornwall	50.52°N 04.85°W	SW9873
Burniestrype	Moray	57.65°N 03.15°W	NJ3163
Burniston	North Yorkshire	54.32°N 00.44°W	TA0193
Burnlee	Kirklees	53.55°N 01.82°W	SE1207
Burnley	Lancashire	53.78°N 02.25°W	SD8332
Burnley Lane	Lancashire	53.80°N 02.24°W	SD8434
Burnley Wood	Lancashire	53.77°N 02.24°W	SD8431
Burnmouth	Scottish Borders	55.84°N 02.08°W	NT9561
Burn Naze	Lancashire	53.87°N 03.02°W	SD3343
Burn of Cambus	Stirling	56.20°N 04.09°W	NN7003
Burnopfield	Durham	54.89°N 01.75°W	NZ1656
Burnrigg	Cumbria	54.88°N 02.82°W	NY4755
Burnsall	North Yorkshire	54.04°N 01.95°W	SE0361
Burn's Green	Hertfordshire	51.88°N 00.11°W	TL3022
Burnside (Methven)	Perth and Kinross	56.40°N 03.60°W	NO0125
Burnside (Gateside)	Perth and Kinross	56.25°N 03.35°W	NO1608
Burnside	Shetland Islands	60.48°N 01.51°W	HU2778
Burnside	Sunderland	54.84°N 01.48°W	NZ3350
Burnside	East Ayrshire	55.37°N 04.24°W	NS5811
Burnside	West Lothian	55.92°N 03.45°W	NT0971
Burnside	South Lanarkshire	55.81°N 04.20°W	NS6260
Burnside of Duntrune	City of Dundee	56.49°N 02.91°W	NO4434
Burnstone	Devon	50.98°N 04.39°W	SS3223
Burnt Ash	Gloucestershire	51.70°N 02.17°W	SO8801
Burntcommon	Surrey	51.27°N 00.52°W	TQ0354
Burnt Heath	Essex	51.91°N 00.99°E	TM0628
Burntheath	Derbyshire	52.87°N 01.64°W	SK2431
Burnt Hill	Berkshire	51.46°N 01.19°W	SU5674
Burnthouse	Cornwall	50.18°N 05.13°W	SW7636
Burntisland	Fife	56.06°N 03.23°W	NT2386
Burnt Mills	Essex	51.58°N 00.49°E	TQ7390
Burnt Oak	Barnet	51.60°N 00.26°W	TQ2091
Burnt Oak	East Sussex	51.02°N 00.15°E	TQ5127
Burnton	East Ayrshire	55.32°N 04.41°W	NS4706
Burnt Tree	Dudley	52.50°N 02.07°W	SO9590
Burntwick Island	Kent	51.42°N 00.67°E	TQ860725
Burntwood	Staffordshire	52.67°N 01.92°W	SK0509
Burntwood Green	Staffordshire	52.67°N 01.89°W	SK0708
Burntwood Pentre	Flintshire	53.16°N 03.06°W	SJ2964
Burnt Yates	North Yorkshire	54.04°N 01.61°W	SE2561
Burnworthy	Somerset	50.92°N 03.16°W	ST1815
Burnwynd	West Lothian	55.89°N 03.39°W	NT1368

==== Burp-Bury ====
Location	Locality	Coordinates (links to map & photo sources)	OS grid reference
Burpham	Surrey	51.25°N 00.55°W	TQ0152
Burpham	West Sussex	50.86°N 00.52°W	TQ0408
Burradon	Northumberland	55.34°N 02.03°W	NT9806
Burradon	North Tyneside	55.04°N 01.57°W	NZ2772
Burrafirth	Shetland Islands	60.79°N 00.88°W	HP6113
Burras	Cornwall	50.16°N 05.26°W	SW6734
Burrastow	Shetland Islands	60.20°N 01.60°W	HU2247
Burraton	Cornwall	50.40°N 04.23°W	SX4159
Burraton Coombe	Cornwall	50.40°N 04.23°W	SX4158
Burravoe (Mainland)	Shetland Islands	60.38°N 01.36°W	HU3567
Burravoe (Yell)	Shetland Islands	60.49°N 01.05°W	HU5279
Burray	Orkney Islands	58.85°N 02.90°W	ND477966
Burray Village	Orkney Islands	58.84°N 02.92°W	ND4795
Burrells	Cumbria	54.55°N 02.49°W	NY6818
Burrelton	Perth and Kinross	56.51°N 03.30°W	NO2037
Burridge (near Barnstaple)	Devon	51.09°N 04.05°W	SS5635
Burridge (Chardstock)	Devon	50.84°N 02.98°W	ST3106
Burridge	Hampshire	50.88°N 01.27°W	SU5110
Burrigill	Highland	58.28°N 03.33°W	ND2234
Burrill	North Yorkshire	54.27°N 01.64°W	SE2387
Burringham	North Lincolnshire	53.57°N 00.74°W	SE8309
Burrington	Devon	50.92°N 03.95°W	SS6316
Burrington	Herefordshire	52.34°N 02.82°W	SO4472
Burrington	North Somerset	51.32°N 02.74°W	ST4859
Burrough End	Cambridgeshire	52.16°N 00.36°E	TL6255
Burrough Green	Cambridgeshire	52.16°N 00.38°E	TL6355
Burrough on the Hill	Leicestershire	52.68°N 00.89°W	SK7510
Burroughs Grove	Buckinghamshire	51.59°N 00.77°W	SU8589
Burroughston	Orkney Islands	59.06°N 02.82°W	HY5320
Burrow (Exmoor)	Somerset	51.16°N 03.53°W	SS9342
Burrow (South Somerset)	Somerset	50.97°N 02.84°W	ST4120
Burrow (Broadclyst)	Devon	50.76°N 03.43°W	SX9997
Burrow (Newton Poppleford)	Devon	50.69°N 03.31°W	SY0789
Burrowbridge	Somerset	51.06°N 02.92°W	ST3530
Burrow Head	Dumfries and Galloway	54.68°N 04.39°W	NX455347
Burrowhill	Surrey	51.35°N 00.60°W	SU9763
Burrows Cross	Surrey	51.20°N 00.45°W	TQ0846
Burrowsmoor Holt	Nottinghamshire	52.96°N 00.95°W	SK7041
Burrsville Park	Essex	51.80°N 01.16°E	TM1817
Burrswood	East Sussex	51.11°N 00.17°E	TQ5237
Burry	Swansea	51.58°N 04.23°W	SS4590
Burry Green	Swansea	51.59°N 04.22°W	SS4691
Burry Port (Porth Tywyn)	Carmarthenshire	51.68°N 04.25°W	SN4401
Burscott	Devon	50.99°N 04.40°W	SS3124
Burscough	Lancashire	53.58°N 02.86°W	SD4310
Burscough Bridge	Lancashire	53.59°N 02.84°W	SD4411
Bursdon	Devon	50.94°N 04.47°W	SS2619
Bursea	East Riding of Yorkshire	53.78°N 00.78°W	SE8033
Burshill	East Riding of Yorkshire	53.91°N 00.34°W	TA0948
Bursledon	Hampshire	50.87°N 01.31°W	SU4809
Burslem	City of Stoke-on-Trent	53.03°N 02.19°W	SJ8749
Burstall	Suffolk	52.05°N 01.04°E	TM0944
Burstallhill	Suffolk	52.06°N 01.03°E	TM0845
Burstock	Dorset	50.82°N 02.82°W	ST4203
Burston	Devon	50.80°N 03.83°W	SS7102
Burston	Norfolk	52.40°N 01.13°E	TM1383
Burston	Staffordshire	52.86°N 02.09°W	SJ9430
Burstow	Surrey	51.15°N 00.14°W	TQ3041
Burstwick	East Riding of Yorkshire	53.72°N 00.15°W	TA2227
Burtersett	North Yorkshire	54.29°N 02.17°W	SD8989
Burtholme	Cumbria	54.96°N 02.71°W	NY5463
Burthorpe	Suffolk	52.24°N 00.59°E	TL7764
Burthwaite	Cumbria	54.83°N 02.92°W	NY4149
Burtle	Somerset	51.17°N 02.87°W	ST3942
Burtle Hill	Somerset	51.18°N 02.87°W	ST3943
Burtoft	Lincolnshire	52.89°N 00.12°W	TF2635
Burton (Gowy)	Cheshire	53.16°N 02.74°W	SJ5063
Burton (Neston)	Cheshire	53.25°N 03.03°W	SJ3174
Burton (Christchurch)	Dorset	50.74°N 01.77°W	SZ1694
Burton (Dorchester)	Dorset	50.71°N 02.45°W	SY6891
Burton	The Vale Of Glamorgan	51.39°N 03.39°W	ST0367
Burton	Lincolnshire	53.25°N 00.56°W	SK9674
Burton	Pembrokeshire	51.70°N 04.92°W	SM9805
Burton (Stogursey)	Somerset	51.18°N 03.16°W	ST1944
Burton (North Coker)	Somerset	50.91°N 02.67°W	ST5313
Burton (Mere)	Wiltshire	51.08°N 02.25°W	ST8232
Burton (Nettleton)	Wiltshire	51.50°N 02.27°W	ST8179
Burton	Wrexham	53.10°N 02.97°W	SJ3557
Burton Agnes	East Riding of Yorkshire	54.05°N 00.32°W	TA1063
Burton Bradstock	Dorset	50.69°N 02.73°W	SY4889
Burton Constable	East Riding of Yorkshire	53.81°N 00.19°W	TA1937
Burton Corner	Lincolnshire	52.98°N 00.02°W	TF3345
Burton Dassett	Warwickshire	52.15°N 01.43°W	SP3951
Burton End	Cambridgeshire	52.11°N 00.36°E	TL6249
Burton End	Essex	51.88°N 00.22°E	TL5323
Burton Ferry	Pembrokeshire	51.70°N 04.92°W	SM9805
Burton Fleming	East Riding of Yorkshire	54.13°N 00.34°W	TA0872
Burton Green	Warwickshire	52.37°N 01.61°W	SP2675
Burton's Green	Essex	51.90°N 00.64°E	TL8226
Burton Green	Wrexham	53.11°N 02.98°W	SJ3458
Burton Hastings	Warwickshire	52.49°N 01.39°W	SP4189
Burton-in-Kendal	Cumbria	54.17°N 02.72°W	SD5376
Burton in Lonsdale	North Yorkshire	54.14°N 02.53°W	SD6572
Burton Joyce	Nottinghamshire	52.98°N 01.04°W	SK6443
Burton Latimer	Northamptonshire	52.35°N 00.69°W	SP8974
Burton Lazars	Leicestershire	52.73°N 00.87°W	SK7616
Burton-le-Coggles	Lincolnshire	52.81°N 00.56°W	SK9725
Burton Leonard	North Yorkshire	54.06°N 01.51°W	SE3263
Burton Manor	Staffordshire	52.77°N 02.13°W	SJ9120
Burton on the Wolds	Leicestershire	52.78°N 01.12°W	SK5921
Burton Overy	Leicestershire	52.57°N 01.01°W	SP6798
Burton Pedwardine	Lincolnshire	52.96°N 00.34°W	TF1142
Burton Pidsea	East Riding of Yorkshire	53.76°N 00.10°W	TA2531
Burton Salmon	North Yorkshire	53.73°N 01.25°W	SE4927
Burton Stather	North Lincolnshire	53.65°N 00.70°W	SE8618
Burton upon Stather	North Lincolnshire	53.64°N 00.68°W	SE8717
Burton upon Trent	Staffordshire	52.79°N 01.64°W	SK2422
Burtonwood	Cheshire	53.42°N 02.66°W	SJ5692
Burwardsley	Cheshire	53.09°N 02.73°W	SJ5156
Burwarton	Shropshire	52.46°N 02.57°W	SO6185
Burwash	East Sussex	50.99°N 00.37°E	TQ6724
Burwash Common	East Sussex	50.98°N 00.33°E	TQ6423
Burwash Weald	East Sussex	50.98°N 00.34°E	TQ6523
Burwell	Cambridgeshire	52.26°N 00.31°E	TL5866
Burwell	Lincolnshire	53.29°N 00.02°E	TF3579
Burwen	Isle of Anglesey	53.41°N 04.39°W	SH4193
Burwick	Shetland Islands	60.14°N 01.29°W	HU3940
Burwood	Shropshire	52.47°N 02.76°W	SO4887
Burwood Park	Surrey	51.36°N 00.42°W	TQ1064
Bury	Cambridgeshire	52.43°N 00.11°W	TL2883
Bury	Greater Manchester	53.58°N 02.30°W	SD8010
Bury	Somerset	51.03°N 03.51°W	SS9427
Bury	West Sussex	50.90°N 00.56°W	TQ0113
Buryas Br	Cornwall	50.10°N 05.58°W	SW4429
Burybank	Staffordshire	52.91°N 02.17°W	SJ8835
Bury End (Stagsden)	Bedfordshire	52.13°N 00.56°W	SP9850
Bury End (Shillington)	Bedfordshire	51.99°N 00.37°W	TL1234
Bury End	Worcestershire	52.02°N 01.87°W	SP0936
Bury Green (Bishop's Stortford)	Hertfordshire	51.86°N 00.10°E	TL4521
Bury Green (Cheshunt)	Hertfordshire	51.69°N 00.06°W	TL3401
Bury Park	Luton	51.87°N 00.43°W	TL0821
Bury's Bank	Berkshire	51.38°N 01.29°W	SU4965
Bury St Edmunds	Suffolk	52.24°N 00.70°E	TL8564
Burythorpe	North Yorkshire	54.06°N 00.79°W	SE7964

=== Bus ===
Location	Locality	Coordinates (links to map & photo sources)	OS grid reference
Busbiehill	East Ayrshire	55.61°N 04.57°W	NS3839
Busbridge	Surrey	51.16°N 00.61°W	SU9742
Busby	East Renfrewshire	55.77°N 04.28°W	NS5756
Buscot	Oxfordshire	51.67°N 01.66°W	SU2397
Buscott	Somerset	51.13°N 02.80°W	ST4438
Bush	Cornwall	50.83°N 04.51°W	SS2307
Bush	Aberdeenshire	56.77°N 02.39°W	NO7665
Bush Bank	Herefordshire	52.15°N 02.80°W	SO4551
Bushbury	Surrey	51.21°N 00.29°W	TQ1947
Bushbury	Wolverhampton	52.62°N 02.11°W	SJ9203
Bushby	Leicestershire	52.63°N 01.04°W	SK6504
Bush End	Essex	51.84°N 00.24°E	TL5519
Bush Estate	Norfolk	52.80°N 01.55°E	TG4029
Bushey	Dorset	50.64°N 02.02°W	SY9883
Bushey	Hertfordshire	51.64°N 00.36°W	TQ1395
Bushey Ground	Oxfordshire	51.77°N 01.55°W	SP3109
Bushey Heath	Hertfordshire	51.63°N 00.33°W	TQ1594
Bushey Mead	Merton	51.39°N 00.23°W	TQ2368
Bushfield	Cumbria	55.11°N 02.83°W	NY4780
Bush Green (Pulham Market)	Norfolk	52.43°N 01.25°E	TM2187
Bush Green (Great Ellingham)	Norfolk	52.54°N 00.97°E	TM0298
Bush Green	Suffolk	52.17°N 00.79°E	TL9157
Bush Hill Park	Enfield	51.63°N 00.07°W	TQ3395
Bushley	Worcestershire	52.00°N 02.19°W	SO8734
Bushley Green	Worcestershire	52.00°N 02.20°W	SO8634
Bushmead	Bedfordshire	52.22°N 00.37°W	TL1160
Bushmoor	Shropshire	52.47°N 02.84°W	SO4387
Bushton	Wiltshire	51.49°N 01.91°W	SU0677
Bushy Common	Norfolk	52.67°N 00.88°E	TF9513
Bushy Hill	Surrey	51.24°N 00.53°W	TQ0251
Busk	Cumbria	54.77°N 02.62°W	NY6042
Busk	Oldham	53.54°N 02.13°W	SD9105
Buslingthorpe	Lincolnshire	53.35°N 00.37°W	TF0885
Bussage	Gloucestershire	51.72°N 02.17°W	SO8803
Buss Craig	Scottish Borders	55.87°N 02.08°W	NT947642
Bussex	Somerset	51.11°N 02.93°W	ST3535
Busta	Shetland Islands	60.37°N 01.38°W	HU3466
Bustard Green	Essex	51.92°N 00.38°E	TL6428
Bustard's Green	Norfolk	52.48°N 01.19°E	TM1792
Bustatoun	Orkney Islands	59.35°N 02.42°W	HY7652
Busveal	Cornwall	50.22°N 05.21°W	SW7141

=== But ===
Location	Locality	Coordinates (links to map & photo sources)	OS grid reference
Butcher's Common	Norfolk	52.72°N 01.46°E	TG3420
Butcher's Cross	East Sussex	51.00°N 00.20°E	TQ5525
Butcombe	North Somerset	51.34°N 02.70°W	ST5161
Bute Town	Caerphilly	51.77°N 03.30°W	SO1009
Butetown	Cardiff	51.45°N 03.18°W	ST1874
Butlane Head	Shropshire	52.71°N 02.87°W	SJ4113
Butleigh	Somerset	51.09°N 02.68°W	ST5233
Butleigh Wootton	Somerset	51.11°N 02.71°W	ST5035
Butlersbank	Shropshire	52.79°N 02.62°W	SJ5822
Butler's Cross (Ellesborough)	Buckinghamshire	51.75°N 00.78°W	SP8407
Butlers Cross (Chalfont St Giles)	Buckinghamshire	51.61°N 00.60°W	SU9792
Butler's Hill	Nottinghamshire	53.02°N 01.19°W	SK5448
Butlers Marston	Warwickshire	52.14°N 01.54°W	SP3150
Butley	Suffolk	52.11°N 01.43°E	TM351515
Butley High Corner	Suffolk	52.08°N 01.47°E	TM3849
Butley Low Corner	Suffolk	52.08°N 01.47°E	TM3849
Butley Town	Cheshire	53.29°N 02.13°W	SJ9177
Butlocks Heath	Hampshire	50.86°N 01.34°W	SU4608
Butter Bank	Staffordshire	52.80°N 02.19°W	SJ8723
Buttercrambe	North Yorkshire	54.01°N 00.88°W	SE7358
Butteriss Gate	Cornwall	50.15°N 05.20°W	SW7133
Butterknowle	Durham	54.62°N 01.84°W	NZ1025
Butterleigh	Devon	50.86°N 03.46°W	SS9708
Butterley (Ripley)	Derbyshire	53.05°N 01.40°W	SK4051
Butterley (Ashover)	Derbyshire	53.13°N 01.49°W	SK3460
Buttermere	Cumbria	54.54°N 03.28°W	NY1717
Buttermere	Wiltshire	51.34°N 01.51°W	SU3461
Butterrow	Gloucestershire	51.72°N 02.21°W	SO8503
Butters Green	Staffordshire	53.04°N 02.28°W	SJ8150
Buttershaw	Calderdale	53.75°N 01.80°W	SE1329
Butterton (Newcastle-under-Lyme)	Staffordshire	52.97°N 02.25°W	SJ8342
Butterton (Peak District)	Staffordshire	53.10°N 01.89°W	SK0756
Butterwick	Cumbria	54.56°N 02.75°W	NY5119
Butterwick	Durham	54.65°N 01.41°W	NZ3829
Butterwick	Lincolnshire	52.98°N 00.05°E	TF3845
Butterwick (Barton-le-Street)	North Yorkshire	54.18°N 00.88°W	SE7377
Butterwick (Foxholes)	North Yorkshire	54.12°N 00.48°W	SE9971
Butteryhaugh	Northumberland	55.23°N 02.58°W	NY6393
Butt Green	Cheshire	53.05°N 02.50°W	SJ6651
Buttington	Powys	52.66°N 03.12°W	SJ2408
Butt Lane	Staffordshire	53.08°N 02.27°W	SJ8254
Butt of Lewis (Rubha Robhanais)	Western Isles	58.51°N 06.26°W	NB516660
Buttonbridge	Shropshire	52.40°N 02.39°W	SO7379
Button Haugh Green	Suffolk	52.25°N 00.91°E	TL9966
Buttonoak	Shropshire	52.39°N 02.38°W	SO7477
Button's Green	Suffolk	52.14°N 00.79°E	TL9153
Butts	Devon	50.68°N 03.70°W	SX8089
Buttsash	Hampshire	50.84°N 01.40°W	SU4205
Buttsbear Cross	Cornwall	50.80°N 04.47°W	SS2604
Buttsbury	Essex	51.65°N 00.39°E	TQ6698
Butt's Green	Essex	51.69°N 00.54°E	TL7603
Butt's Green	Hampshire	51.03°N 01.57°W	SU3026
Buttsole	Kent	51.23°N 01.29°E	TR3054
Butt Yeats	Lancashire	54.09°N 02.64°W	SD5867

=== Bux ===
Location	Locality	Coordinates (links to map & photo sources)	OS grid reference
Buxhall	Suffolk	52.17°N 00.90°E	TL9957
Buxhall Fen Street	Suffolk	52.19°N 00.92°E	TM0059
Buxley	Scottish Borders	55.77°N 02.32°W	NT8054
Buxted	East Sussex	50.98°N 00.12°E	TQ4923
Buxton	Derbyshire	53.25°N 01.91°W	SK0673
Buxton	Norfolk	52.74°N 01.30°E	TG2322
Buxworth	Derbyshire	53.33°N 01.97°W	SK0282

== Bw ==
Location	Locality	Coordinates (links to map & photo sources)	OS grid reference
Bwcle (Buckley)	Flintshire	53.16°N 03.09°W	SJ2764
Bwlch	Powys	51.88°N 03.25°W	SO1421
Bwlch	Flintshire	53.22°N 03.24°W	SJ1771
Bwlch	Gwynedd	52.62°N 04.11°W	SH5705
Bwlch-derwin	Gwynedd	52.98°N 04.29°W	SH4646
Bwlchgwyn	Wrexham	53.06°N 03.10°W	SJ2653
Bwlch-Llan	Ceredigion	52.20°N 04.09°W	SN5758
Bwlchnewydd	Carmarthenshire	51.89°N 04.38°W	SN3624
Bwlchtocyn	Gwynedd	52.80°N 04.52°W	SH3026
Bwlch-y-cibau	Powys	52.74°N 03.23°W	SJ1717
Bwlch-y-cwm	Caerdydd (Cardiff)	51.53°N 03.24°W	ST1483
Bwlchyddar	Powys	52.78°N 03.24°W	SJ1622
Bwlch-y-ffridd	Powys	52.54°N 03.38°W	SO0695
Bwlchygroes	Pembrokeshire	51.995°N 04.564°W	SN240360
Bwlchyllyn	Gwynedd	53.07°N 04.24°W	SH5055
Bwlch-y-Plain	Powys	52.36°N 03.11°W	SO2475
Bwlch-y-sarnau	Powys	52.35°N 03.44°W	SO0274

== By ==
Location	Locality	Coordinates (links to map & photo sources)	OS grid reference
Bybrook	Kent	51.16°N 00.87°E	TR0144
Bycross	Herefordshire	52.07°N 02.92°W	SO3742
Byeastwood	Bridgend	51.51°N 03.55°W	SS9281
Bye Green	Buckinghamshire	51.79°N 00.75°W	SP8611
Byerhope	Northumberland	54.80°N 02.21°W	NY8646
Byermoor	Durham	54.90°N 01.72°W	NZ1857
Byers Green	Durham	54.70°N 01.66°W	NZ2234
Byfield	Northamptonshire	52.17°N 01.25°W	SP5153
Byfleet	Surrey	51.33°N 00.47°W	TQ0661
Byford	Herefordshire	52.07°N 02.89°W	SO3942
Byford Common	Herefordshire	52.08°N 02.90°W	SO3843
Bygrave	Hertfordshire	51.99°N 00.16°W	TL2635
Byker	Newcastle upon Tyne	54.97°N 01.57°W	NZ2764
Byland Abbey	North Yorkshire	54.19°N 01.17°W	SE5478
Bylchau	Conwy	53.14°N 03.54°W	SH9762
Byley	Cheshire	53.21°N 02.43°W	SJ7169
Bynea	Carmarthenshire	51.67°N 04.11°W	SS5499
Byram	North Yorkshire	53.71°N 01.27°W	SE4825
Byrness	Northumberland	55.31°N 02.37°W	NT7602
Bythorn	Cambridgeshire	52.36°N 00.45°W	TL0575
Byton	Herefordshire	52.26°N 02.93°W	SO3663
Byton Hand	Herefordshire	52.26°N 02.93°W	SO3663
Bywell	Northumberland	54.94°N 01.93°W	NZ0461
Byworth	West Sussex	50.97°N 00.60°W	SU9820
