= Burlorne =

Burlorne may refer to the following places in Cornwall, England:

- Burlorne Pillow
- Burlorne Tregoose
