= Launcells Cross =

Hamlet in Cornwall, England

Coordinates: 50°49′42″N 4°27′56″W

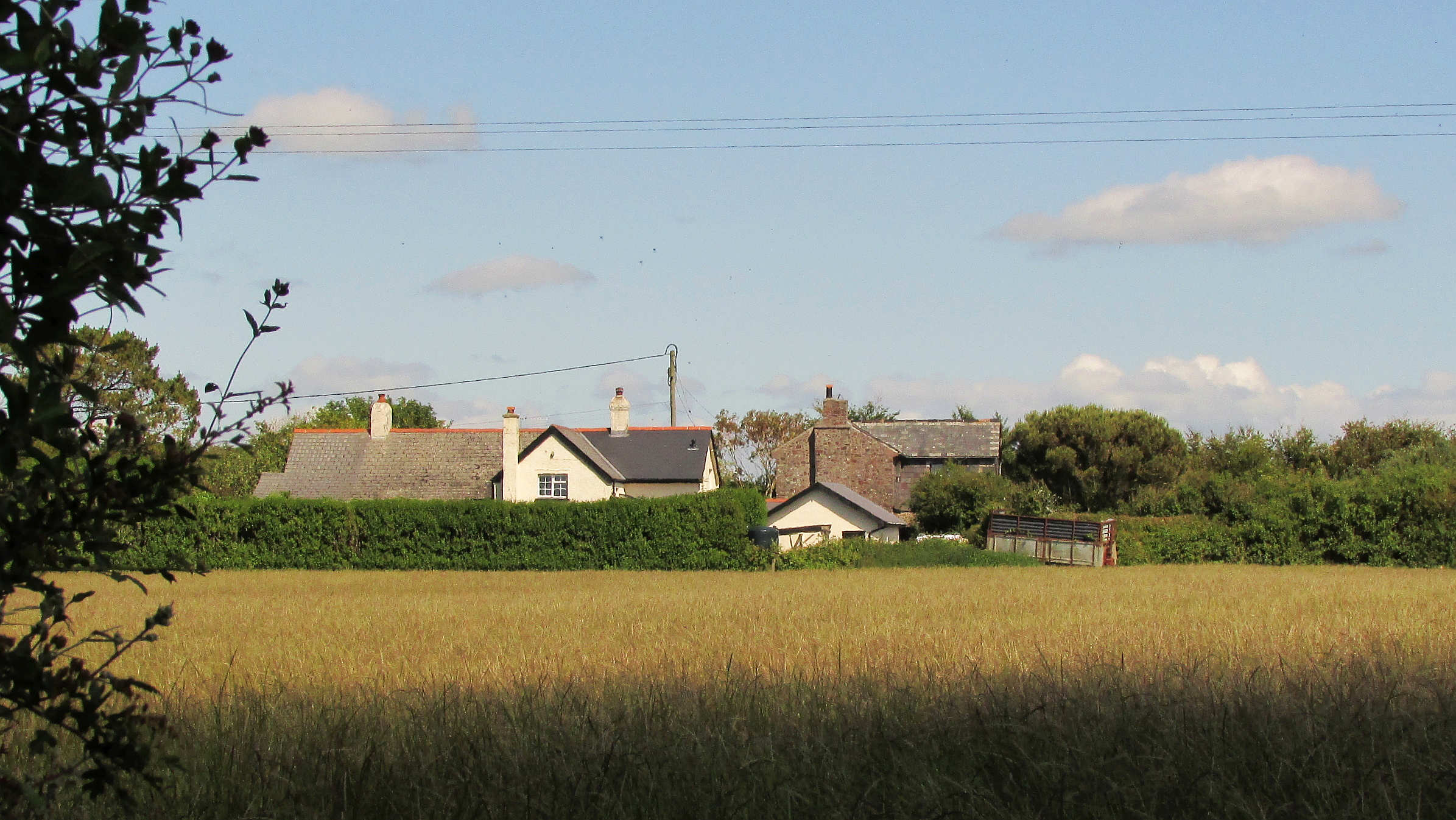
Houses at Launcells Cross

Launcells Cross is a hamlet in the parish of Launcells in Cornwall, England. It is on the B3254 road between Grimscott and Red Post.
