= Busta =

Busta may refer to:

- Busta, Shetland, a location on Mainland, Shetland, Scotland
  - Busta Voe, a sea inlet
- Busta (surname)
- Busta Rhymes (born 1972), American hip hop recording artist, actor, record producer and record executive
- Mouth Moods an album with the track named Busta
