= Saltash West (electoral division) =

Electoral division of Cornwall in the UK

- Electoral district
- Saltash West shown within Cornwall (click to zoom in)
- Country: England
- Sovereign state: United Kingdom
- UK Parliament: South East Cornwall
- Councillors: Sam Tamlin (Liberal Democrat)

Saltash West (Cornish: Essa West) is an electoral division of Cornwall in the United Kingdom and returns one member to sit on Cornwall Council. The current Councillor is Sam Tamlin, a Liberal Democrat.

== Extent ==
Saltash West covers the west of the town of Saltash, including the suburb of Burraton Coombe and part of the suburb of St Stephens (which is shared with the Saltash South division), as well as the villages of Forder and Trematon, and the hamlets of Antony Passage, Trehan and Trevollard. The division covers 1,385 hectares in total.

== Election results ==
=== 2017 election ===
2017 election: Saltash West
| Party | Candidate | Votes | % | ±% |
|---|---|---|---|---|
| Liberal Democrats | Sam Tamlin | 659 | 49.7 | |
| Conservative | Beryl Rosekilly | 431 | 32.5 | |
| Independent | Gloria Challen | 235 | 17.7 | |
| Majority | | 228 | 17.2 | |
| Rejected ballots | | 1 | 0.1 | |
| Turnout | | 1326 | 39.7 | |
| Liberal Democrats hold | | Swing | | |

=== 2013 election ===
2013 election: Saltash West
| Party | Candidate | Votes | % | ±% |
|---|---|---|---|---|
| Liberal Democrats | Bob Austin | 628 | 59.9 | |
| Conservative | Gloria Challen | 377 | 36.0 | |
| Majority | | 251 | 24.0 | |
| Rejected ballots | | 43 | 4.1 | |
| Turnout | | 1048 | 30.4 | |
| Liberal Democrats win (new seat) | | | | |
