= Burston =

Burston may refer to:

== Places ==
- Burston, Buckinghamshire
- Burston, Devon, a United Kingdom location
- Burston, Norfolk
  - Civil parish of Burston and Shimpling
  - Burston railway station
- Burston, Staffordshire, a United Kingdom location
  - Civil parish of Sandon and Burston

=== Fictional places ===
- Burston, England, fictional location of two fictional universities: Burston Central University and the University of Burston

== People with the surname ==
- James Burston (1856-1920), Australian soldier and businessman, father of Roy
- Louis Burston or Louis Burstein (1878-1923), American film producer
- Roy Burston (1888–1960), Australian soldier and physician, son of James
- Winifred Burston (1889-1976), Australian pianist and teacher
- Janet Burston (1935–1998), actress
- Brian Burston (born 1948), Australian politician
- Michael Burston, known as Würzel (1949-2011), English rock musician
- Keith Burston or Keith Burstein (born 1957),
- Sid Burston (born 1959), American actor
- Paul Burston (born 1965), journalist
- Bradley Burston (retired 2019), Israeli journalist
- Jane Burston (born 1981), British scientist
- Matt Burston (born 1982), basketball player
