= Burlorne Pillow =

Coordinates: 50.485°N 4.796°W

Burlorne Pillow: Cornish: Boselowen Pollbrogh
- Location within Cornwall
- OS grid reference: SX017688
- Civil parish: Egloshayle
- Unitary authority: Cornwall Council
- Ceremonial county: Cornwall
- Region: South West
- Country: England
- Sovereign state: United Kingdom
- Post town: WADEBRIDGE
- Postcode district: PL30
- Dialling code: 01208
- Police: Devon and Cornwall
- Fire: Cornwall
- Ambulance: South Western
- UK Parliament: North Cornwall

Burlorne Pillow (Cornish: Boselowen Pollbrogh, meaning dwelling of the elm tree by the badger's pool) is a hamlet in the civil parish of Egloshayle, north Cornwall, England, United Kingdom. It is situated on the eastern bank of the River Camel near Burlawn, Burlorne Tregoose, Polbrock, and Brocton.
