= Butterwick =

Butterwick may refer to the following places:

== England ==
- Butterwick, Cumbria
- Butterwick, Dorset
- Butterwick, County Durham
- Butterwick, Lincolnshire
  - East Butterwick, Isle of Axholme, North Lincolnshire
  - West Butterwick, Isle of Axholme, North Lincolnshire
- Butterwick, Barton-le-Street, North Yorkshire
- Butterwick, Foxholes, North Yorkshire

== Other uses ==
- Butterwick, New South Wales, in Port Stephens Council, Australia
- Mrs Butterwick, a British race horse
