= Barea asbolaea =

Scientific classification
- Kingdom: Animalia
- Phylum: Arthropoda
- Clade: Pancrustacea
- Class: Insecta
- Order: Lepidoptera
- Family: Oecophoridae
- Genus: Barea
- Species: B. asbolaea

Binomial name
- Barea asbolaea (Meyrick,1884)

Synonyms
- Barea asbolaea Meyrick, 1883

Species of moth

Barea asbolaea, also known as the chequered bar and the Buryas Bridge moth, is a moth of the family Oecophoridae found in Australia. It was described by the English amateur entomologist Edward Meyrick in 1883. It is an adventive in Cornwall, where it has been recorded since 2004 at three sites.

== Life history ==
The male moth resembles a species of Depressaria, and so far, females have not been recorded in Cornwall.

The majority of Oecophoridae larvae feed on decaying vegetation or the fungi associated with it. In Cornwall moths have been recorded between April and September.

== Distribution ==
Endemic to Australia, it has been recorded in Tasmania and Western Australia.

Great Britain

It was first found at Buryas Bridge, west Cornwall in 2004 at a moth trap, although not identified until 2010. Initially thought to be one of the Depressaria moths, in 2010 images of the moth and its genitalia were sent to the Natural History Museum and to the Australian National Insect Collection where it was confirmed as Barea absolaea. It has since been found near Crows-an-Wra, 4 miles (6.4 km) west of Buryas Bridge.

A likely source of the Cornish moths is the nearby (0.5 miles (0.80 km)) Trewidden Gardens where exotic plants have been cultivated since the 1860s. The most frequent importation from Tasmania was the tree fern (Dicksonia antarctica), which have rough hairy trunks and could easily contain eggs, larvae or pupae for the two-month voyage from Australia. A Cornwall Moth Group overnight trapping session at the garden recorded seven B. asbolaea.
