= St Swithin's Church, Launcells =

Church in Launcells, Cornwall

St Swithin's Church
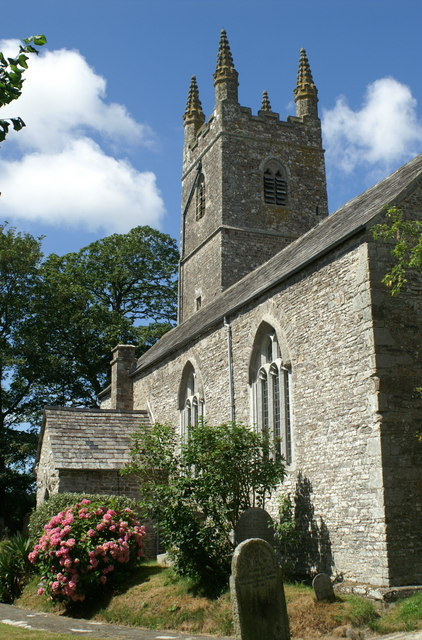
- St Swithin's Church
- 50.82436°N 4.49481°W
- OS grid reference: SS 24389 05715
- Location: Launcells
- Country: England
- Denomination: Church of England

Administration
- Diocese: Truro
- Archdeaconry: Bodmin
- Deanery: Stratton

St Swithin's Church, Launcells is a Grade I listed parish church in Launcells, Cornwall, England. The building dates from the 14th to 17th centuries and is primarily a late-medieval Perpendicular church with later alterations. The church is known for its exceptional collection of carved bench ends and its well-preserved historic interior.

== History ==
A church at Launcells existed by the time of the Domesday Book in 1086, probably dating from the late Saxon or early Norman period. In the early 12th century it was granted to Hartland Abbey in Devon, and the first recorded vicar was Hugo de Moltone in 1261. The church was originally dedicated to St Andrew but was rededicated to St Swithin in 1321.

The porch was added in the late 15th or early 16th century, and the west tower dates from the 16th century. The east end was partly altered in the 17th century, marked by a datestone of 1689. Some window tracery was replaced in the 20th century. The church was designated a Grade I listed building in 1985.

== Architecture ==
=== Structure and fabric ===
The church is built of stone rubble with granite dressings and slate roofs. The porch uses Polyphant stone, a local greenish igneous stone from near Launceston. The largely Perpendicular plan comprises a chancel, nave with north and south aisles of five bays, west tower, and south porch.

The aisles contain mainly four-light Perpendicular windows, some with 20th-century tracery based on 16th-century designs. The east window of the chancel is a repaired late-medieval opening altered in the 17th century. The north aisle has a moulded granite string course, hood-moulded windows with label stops, and a blocked north doorway.

The west tower is a three-stage, battlemented Perpendicular tower with pinnacles and two-light belfry openings. The gabled south porch has a Polyphant stone outer arch and retains medieval-style fittings, including stone benches, a holy-water stoup, and an old timber door with original ironwork.

=== Interior ===
The interior is notably tall with chamfered arches and capitals carved with fleur-de-lis. Different stone was used for the north and south aisles. A small sanctuary backed by a tall Gothic reredos fills the east wall. There are five-bay arcades with moulded arches carried on polyphant and granite piers. The nave and aisle roofs are wagon-vaulted, the north aisle roof contains finely carved ribs and bosses, including foliage and the arms of the Grenville family.

== Monuments, glass and fittings ==
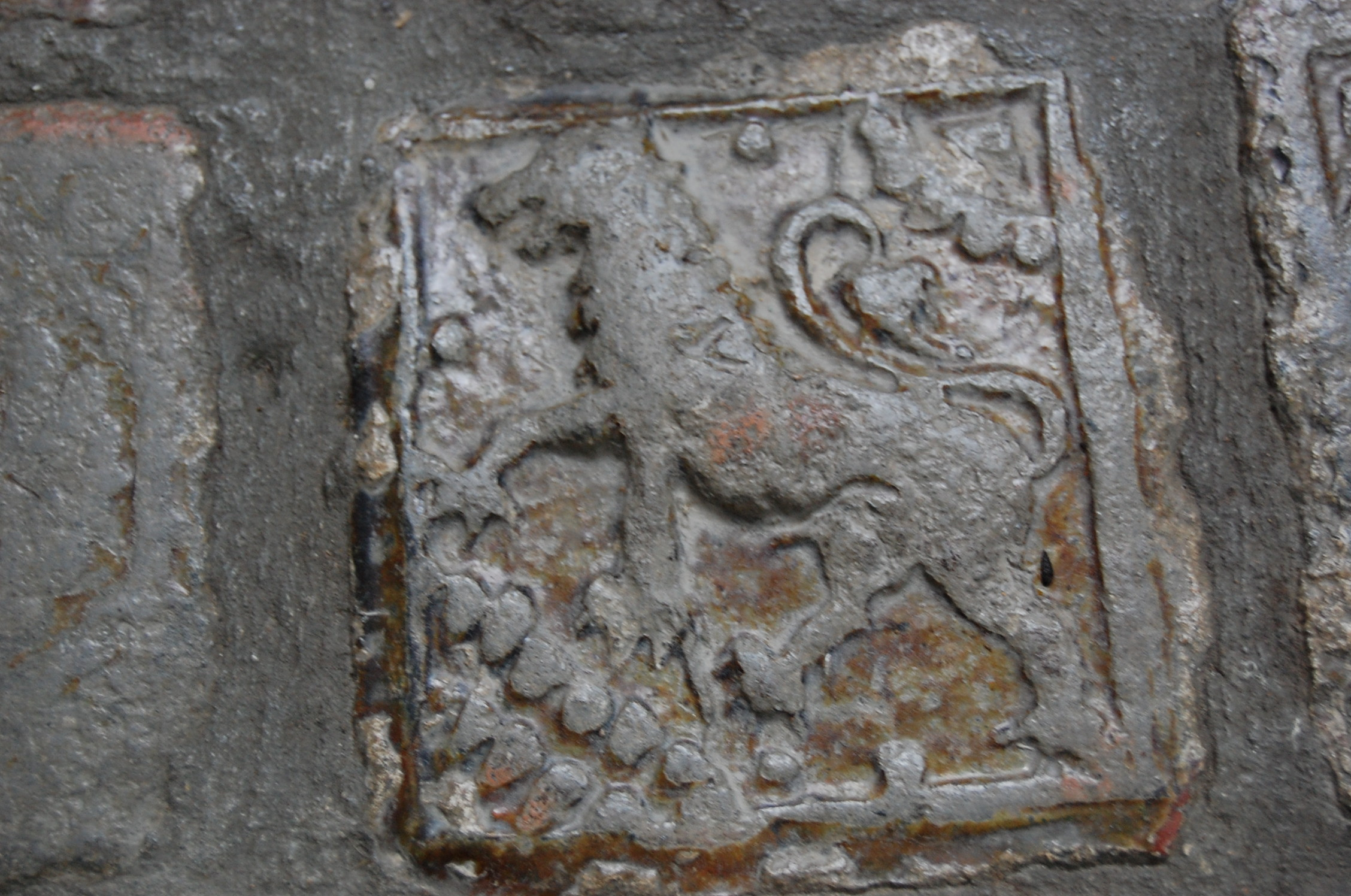
Floor tile, St Swithin's Church

The chancel contains an extensive collection of encaustic Barnstaple tiles, dated to about 1400. Many were preserved in vaults beneath the floor and therefore retain much of their original glazing. The decoration includes figures such as pelicans, lions, gryphons, and floral designs.

St Swithin's retains a 12th-century font with cable moulding and a chancel step formed from an important collection of 16th-century Barnstaple glazed tiles. Other fittings include late-18th-century marble communion and commandment tablets, a Gothick pulpit, panelled box pews, and decorative panelling dating from the 17th to early 19th centuries.

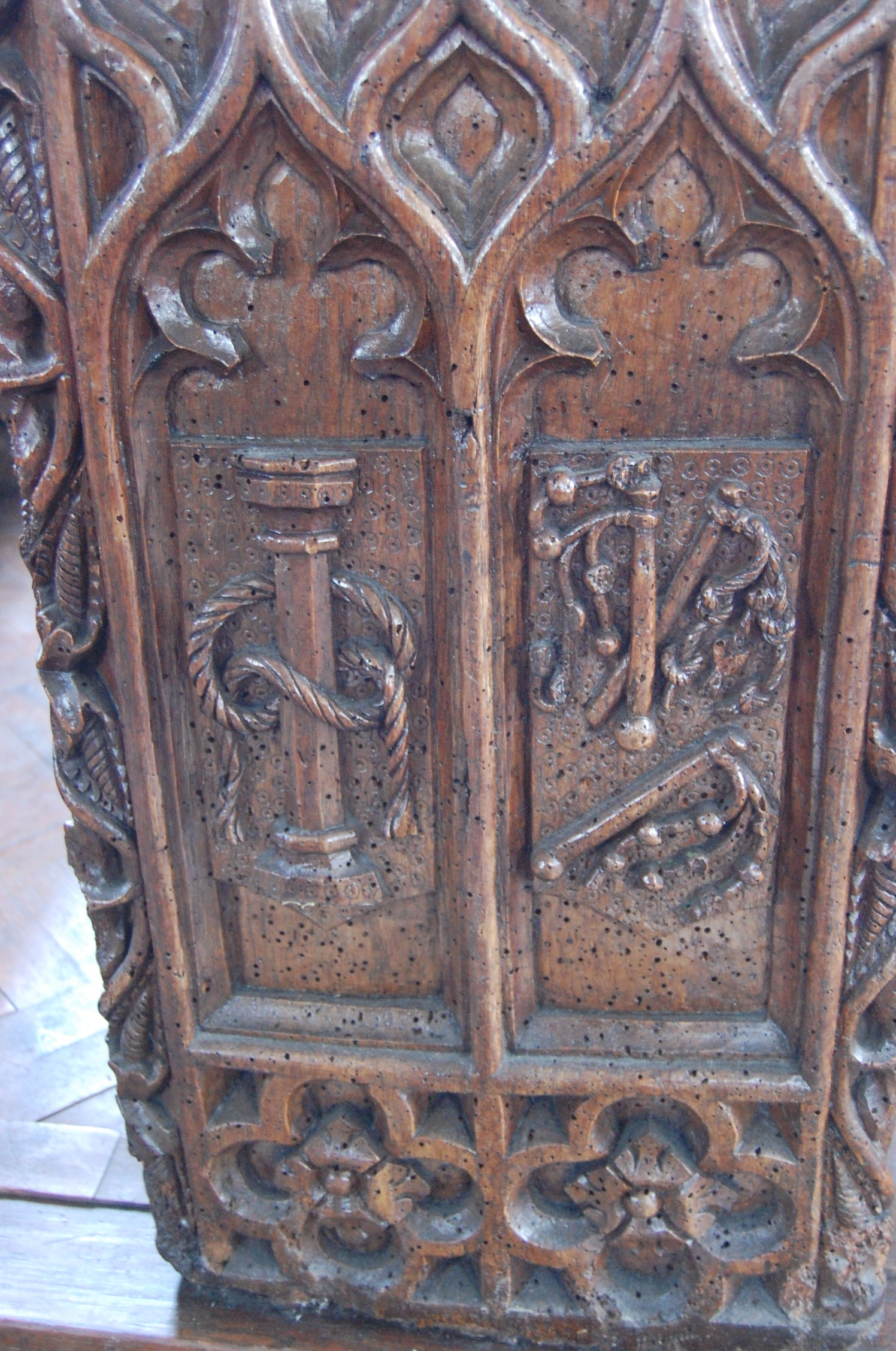
Carved bench ends, St Swithin's

Wall paintings, including a large depiction of the Sacrifice of Isaac and painted royalist text dated 1643, survive beneath early plaster. The church also contains extensive slate memorial flooring, clear historic glazing, and a ring of six bells, two dated 1751. Notable monuments include the effigy tomb of Sir John Charmond (d. 1624). A large coat of arms of Charles II in the south aisle surmounts the entrance to a vanished rood loft on the north wall.

=== Wooden benches ===
The church is noted for its important collection of 16th-century carved wooden benches, regarded as among the finest in the country. Many survive complete, and show strong similarities to the benches at St James Church at Kilkhampton. About 60 bench ends remain, with designs including symbols of the Passion of Christ, the Ascension, the Agnus Dei, and the arms of the local Grenville family."
