= Burniere =

Coordinates: 50.52505°N 4.83961°W

- Location within Cornwall
- OS grid reference: SW989735
- Shire county: Cornwall
- Region: South West
- Country: England
- Sovereign state: United Kingdom
- Post town: Wadebridge
- Postcode district: PL27
- Police: Devon and Cornwall
- Fire: Cornwall
- Ambulance: South Western
- UK Parliament: North Cornwall

Burniere is a settlement near Bodieve on the outskirts of Wadebridge in north Cornwall, England, United Kingdom.

Charles Henderson proposed that the manor of Burniere was one of those manors granted by King Egbert in 836 to the Bishop of Sherborne. Their names were Lawhitton, Pawton and "Caellwic". If Kelly Rounds are the same as "Caellwic" it follows that Burniere is just the later name of the same manor. The manor of Burniere was mentioned in Domesday Book (1086) when it was held from the Bishop of Exeter by Richard son of Thorold. There were 26 households, land for 12 ploughs, 60 acres of pasture and 10 of woodland; its value was unchanged from the reign of King Edward at 40 shillings (£2 sterling).

In 1879 the owner of the manor was Mr John Allnut.
