= Launcells =

Hamlet in Cornwall, England

Coordinates: 50.828°N 4.465°W

Launcells: Cornish: Lannseles
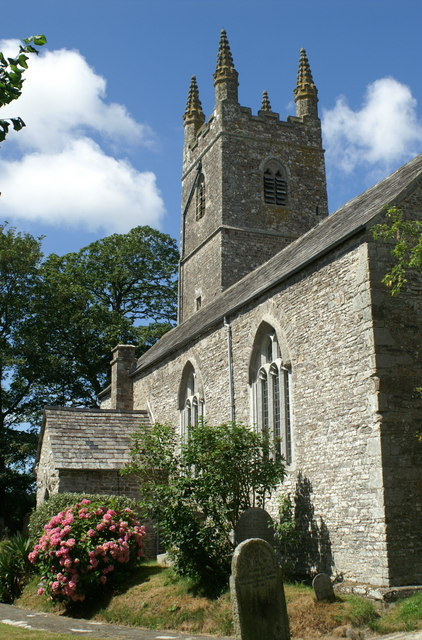
- St Swithin's Church, Launcells, in summer

- Location within Cornwall
- Population: 557 (2011 including Hersham )
- OS grid reference: SS265061
- Civil parish: Launcells
- Unitary authority: Cornwall
- Ceremonial county: Cornwall
- Region: South West
- Country: England
- Sovereign state: United Kingdom
- Post town: BUDE
- Postcode district: EX23
- Dialling code: 01288
- Police: Devon and Cornwall
- Fire: Cornwall
- Ambulance: South Western
- UK Parliament: North Cornwall

Launcells (Cornish: Lannseles) is a hamlet and civil parish in north-east Cornwall, England, United Kingdom. It is located 3 miles (4.8 km) east of Bude.

Within the civil parish are the hamlets of Launcells Cross, Red Post, Grimscott, and Buttsbear Cross. In 2001, 563 people lived within the civil parish, decreasing to 531 at the 2011 census.

== Geography ==
The River Tamar forms the eastern boundary of the civil parish, as well as the Cornish boundary with Devon.

== Parish church ==
The parish church is St Swithin's Church. Nearby, in the wooded valley is the holy well of St Swithin. There are two aisles but the arcades differ: while the north is of granite the south is of older Polyphant stone. The fine series of over 60 benchends is from the same workshop as those of Kilkhampton and Poughill. Other features of interest are the medieval wall painting and the tomb of Sir John Chamond, 1624.

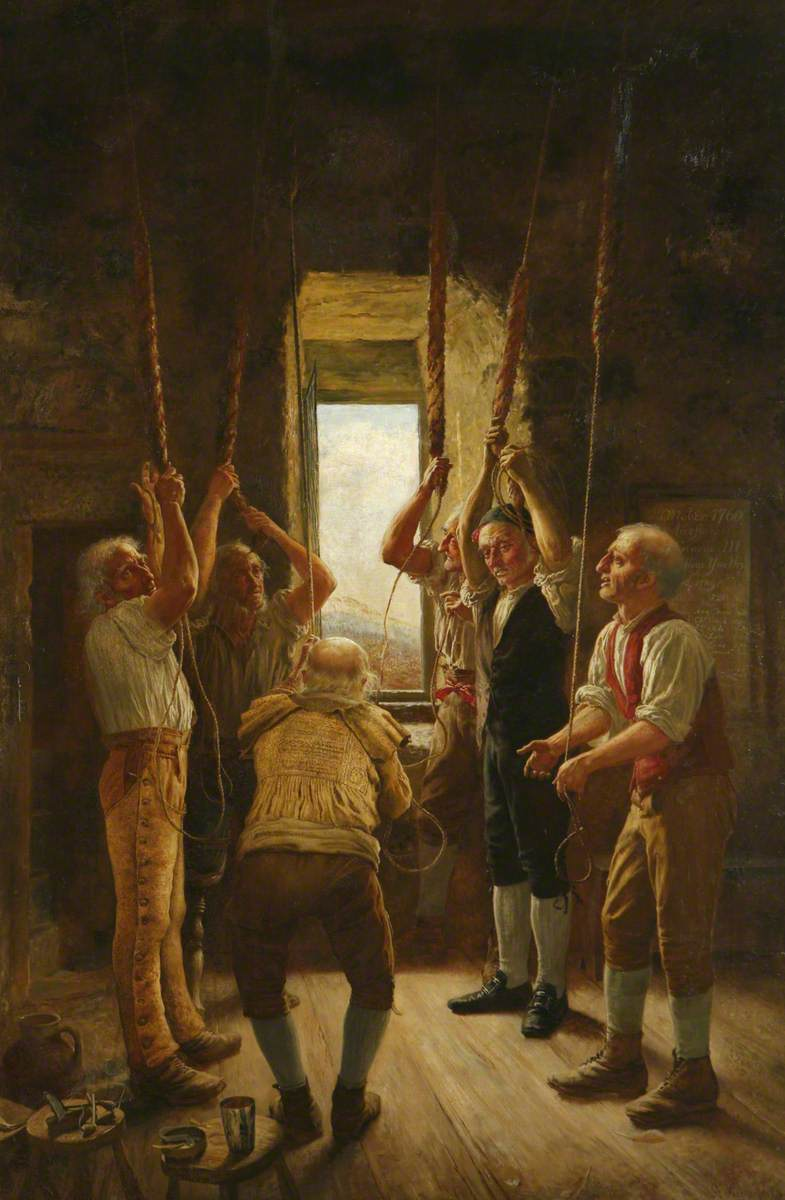
The Ringers of Launcells Tower; painting by Frederick Smallfield

Charles Henderson writing in 1925 gives the dedication as to St Andrew. The origin of the name Launcells is probably from Lan- and a personal name Kellys. In the early Middle Ages the church belonged to Hartland Abbey and there are records of a dispute over the building of the chancel in 1382 which required episcopal intervention. Unusually for a Cornish church it has not been affected by Victorian or later restorations.
