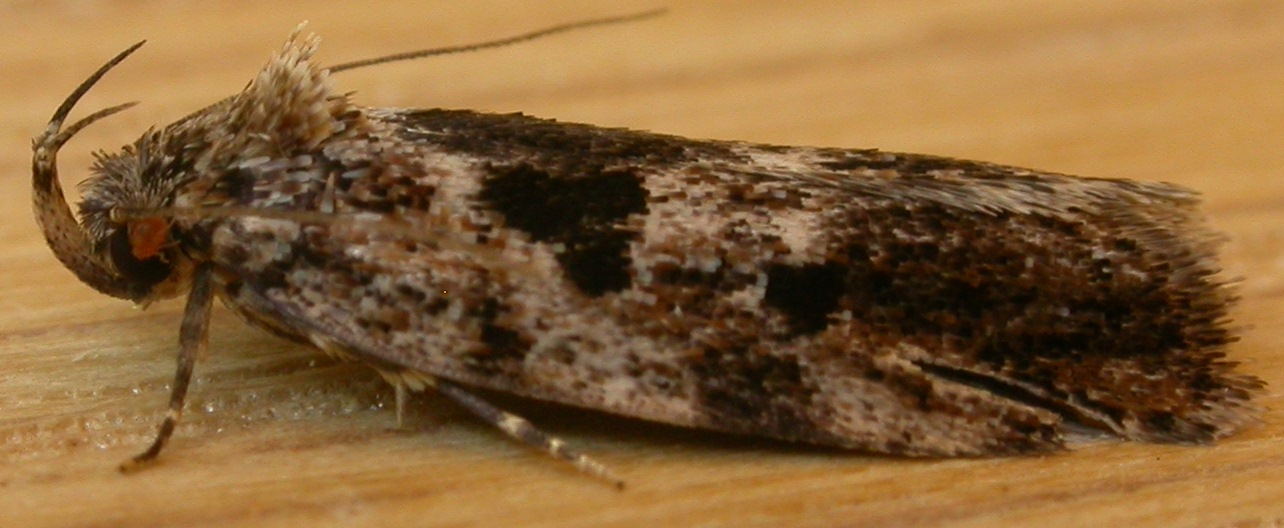

Scientific classification
- Kingdom: Animalia
- Phylum: Arthropoda
- Class: Insecta
- Order: Lepidoptera
- Family: Oecophoridae
- Genus: Barea
- Species: B. melanodelta

Binomial name
- Barea melanodelta Meyrick, 1883

= Barea melanodelta =

Species of moth

Barea melanodelta is a moth of the family Oecophoridae. It is found in Australia, including Tasmania.
