= Grimscott =

Village in Cornwall, England

Coordinates: 50.8359°N 4.4691°W

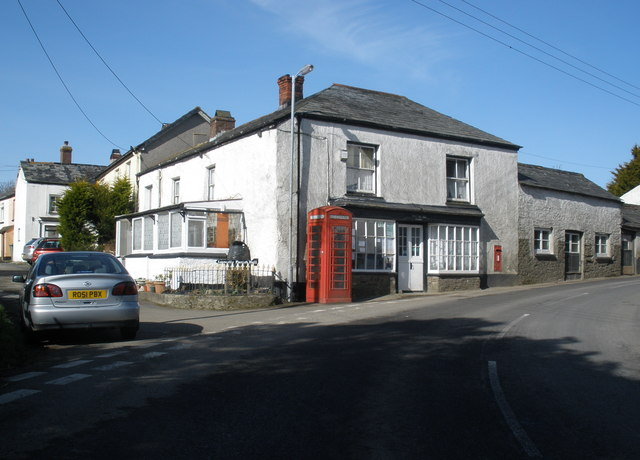
Grimscott post office

Grimscott is a village in north Cornwall, England, UK. It is situated in the civil parish of Launcells, 3 miles (4.8 km) east of the town of Bude.

Half a mile east of the village is Grimscott SSSI (Site of Special Scientific Interest), noted for its biological interest.
