= Busta (surname) =

Busta (feminine: Bustová) is a Czech surname. Notable people with the surname include:

- Christine Busta (1915–1987), Austrian lyricist
- Pablo Carreño Busta (born 1991), Spanish tennis player
- Zbyněk Busta (born 1967), Czech football manager

== See also ==
- Busta (disambiguation)
