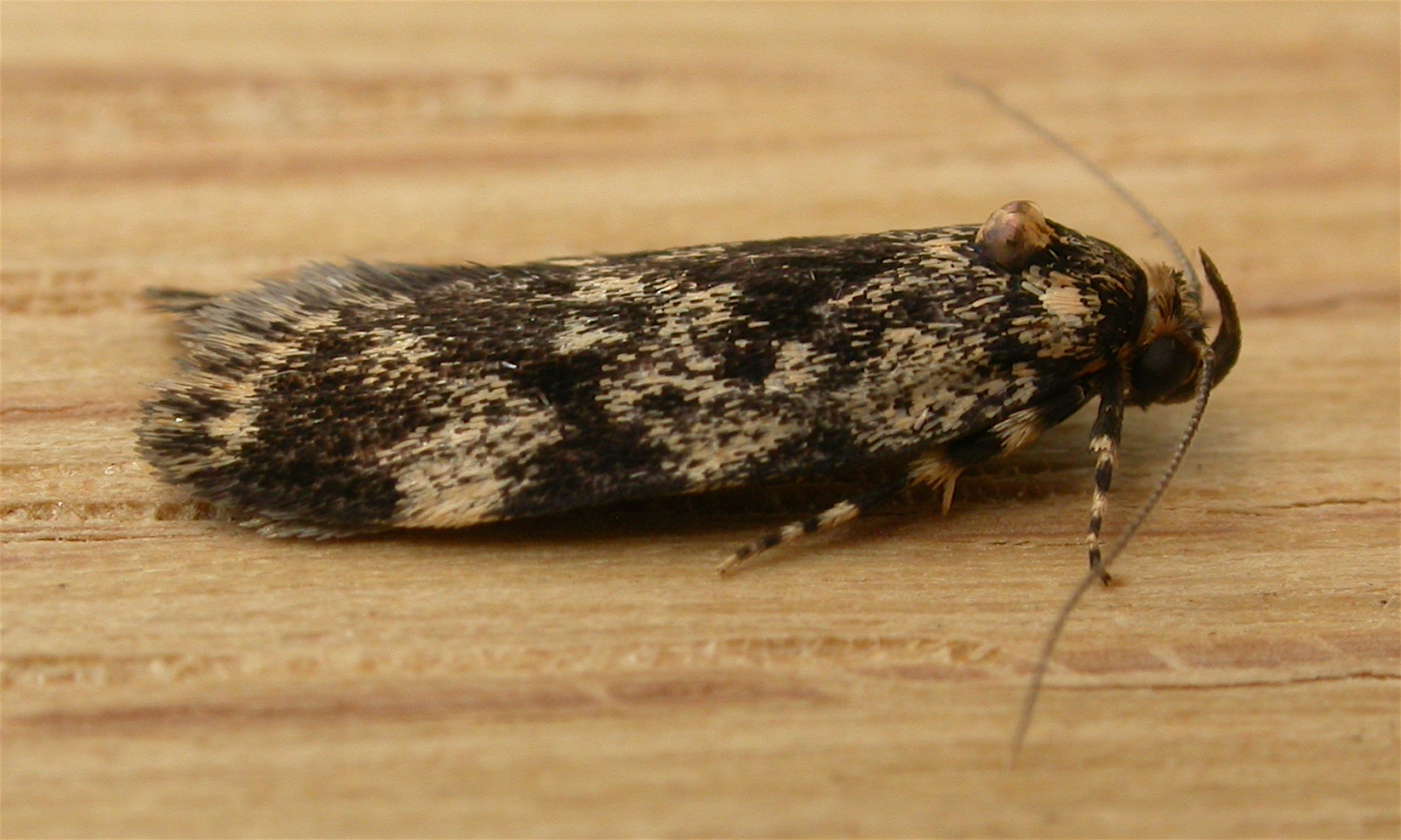
- Barea codrella

Scientific classification
- Domain: Eukaryota
- Kingdom: Animalia
- Phylum: Arthropoda
- Class: Insecta
- Order: Lepidoptera
- Family: Oecophoridae
- Subfamily: Oecophorinae
- Genus: Barea; Walker, 1864

Synonyms
- Phloeopola Meyrick, 1883; Trachyntis Meyrick, 1889; Cyclogona Lower, 1901; Ancharcha Meyrick, 1920; Eucryphaea Turner, 1935; Eucryphaea Turner, 1935; Actenista Turner, 1941; Heterolecta Turner, 1944

= Barea (moth) =

Genus of moths

Barea is a genus of moths of the family Oecophoridae. The genus was erected by Francis Walker in 1864.

All described species are found in Australia, Tasmania and New Zealand.

== Species ==
- Barea acalles (Turner, 1927)
- Barea acritopis (Turner, 1917)
- Barea acrocapna (Turner, 1938)
- Barea adelosema (Lower, 1920)
- Barea aeglitis (Turner, 1940)
- Barea aleuropasta Turner, 1935
- Barea anerasta Turner, 1916
- Barea angusta Turner, 1935
- Barea anisochroa (Turner, 1935)
- Barea arrhythma (Turner, 1917)
- Barea asbolaea (Meyrick, 1883)
- Barea atmophora Turner, 1916
- Barea basigramma (Turner, 1896)
- Barea bathrochorda Turner, 1935
- Barea bryochroa Turner, 1916
- Barea bryopis Turner, 1935
- Barea centropis (Meyrick, 1889)
- Barea ceramodes Turner, 1935
- Barea chloreis (Turner, 1914)
- Barea chlorozona Lower, 1923
- Barea codrella (R. Felder & Rogenhofer, 1875)
- Barea coeliota Turner, 1935
- Barea confusella (Walker, 1864)
- Barea consignatella Walker, 1864
- Barea crassipalpis Turner, 1935
- Barea cratista Turner, 1935
- Barea crypsicentra (Meyrick, 1914)
- Barea crypsipyrrha (Turner, 1938)
- Barea delophanes (Meyrick, 1889)
- Barea desmophora (Meyrick, 1883)
- Barea discincta (Meyrick, 1884)
- Barea dryocoetes (Turner, 1939)
- Barea ebenopa Turner, 1935
- Barea eburnea (Turner, 1935)
- Barea eclecta Turner, 1935
- Barea epethistis (Meyrick, 1902)
- Barea eucapnodes (Turner, 1896)
- Barea euprepes (Turner, 1896)
- Barea eusciasta (Turner, 1916)
- Barea exarcha (Meyrick, 1883)
- Barea fenicoma (Meyrick, 1914)
- Barea fervescens (Turner, 1937)
- Barea glaphyra Turner, 1935
- Barea graphica Turner, 1935
- Barea gypsomicta (Turner, 1937)
- Barea helica (Meyrick, 1883)
- Barea hylodroma Turner, 1916
- Barea hyperarcha (Meyrick, 1889)
- Barea illepida (Turner, 1927)
- Barea inconcinna (Turner, 1927)
- Barea indecorella (Walker, 1864)
- Barea intricata (Turner, 1944)
- Barea lamprota Lower, 1923
- Barea leucocephala (Turner, 1896)
- Barea limpida Turner, 1935
- Barea lithoglypta (Meyrick, 1883)
- Barea melanodelta (Meyrick, 1883)
- Barea meridarcha (Meyrick, 1889)
- Barea mesocentra (Meyrick, 1889)
- Barea micropis (Meyrick, 1889)
- Barea nicaea (Meyrick, 1902)
- Barea nymphica Turner, 1916
- Barea ochrospora Turner, 1935
- Barea ombromorpha (Meyrick, 1920)
- Barea omophaea (Turner, 1941)
- Barea ophiosticha Turner, 1935
- Barea orthoptila (Lower, 1901)
- Barea panarcha (Turner, 1915)
- Barea pasteodes (Turner, 1914)
- Barea peisteria (Turner, 1937)
- Barea periodica Meyrick, 1920
- Barea phaeobrya Turner, 1935
- Barea phaeomochla (Turner, 1938)
- Barea phaulobrya Turner, 1935
- Barea phoenochyta (Turner, 1927)
- Barea pissina Turner, 1935
- Barea placophora (Turner, 1947)
- Barea platyochra Turner, 1935
- Barea plesiosticta Turner, 1935
- Barea poliobrya Turner, 1935
- Barea polytypa (Turner, 1935)
- Barea prepta Turner, 1935
- Barea psathyropa (Turner, 1927)
- Barea psologramma Turner, 1916
- Barea ptochica (Turner, 1917)
- Barea pyrora (Meyrick, 1914)
- Barea sciaspila (Lower, 1904)
- Barea semifixa Meyrick, 1915
- Barea semocausta (Meyrick, 1883)
- Barea sideritis Turner, 1935
- Barea sphaeridias (Meyrick, 1914)
- Barea subviridella (Turner, 1896)
- Barea synchyta (Meyrick, 1883)
- Barea tanyptila Turner, 1935
- Barea trissosema (Turner, 1939)
- Barea trizyga (Meyrick, 1914)
- Barea turbatella (Walker, 1864)
- Barea umbrosa (Meyrick, 1914)
- Barea viduata (Meyrick, 1920)
- Barea xanthocoma (Lower, 1897)
- Barea xanthoptera Turner, 1935
- Barea ypsilon Turner, 1935
- Barea zeugmatophora Turner, 1935
- Barea zophospila (Turner, 1944)
- Barea zygophora (Meyrick, 1889)
