= Saltash South (electoral division) =

Former electoral division of Cornwall in the UK

- Former ward Cornwall Council
- Boundary of Saltash South in Cornwall from 2013-2021.
- County: Cornwall

2013–2021
- Number of councillors: One
- Replaced by: Saltash Essa
- Created from: Saltash Essa

Saltash South (Cornish: Essa Soth) was an electoral division of Cornwall in the United Kingdom which returned one member to sit on Cornwall Council between 2013 and 2021. It was abolished at the 2021 local elections, being succeeded by Saltash Essa.

== Councillors ==
Election	Member	Party
2013	Hilary Frank	Liberal Democrats
2017	Hilary Frank	Liberal Democrats
2021	Seat abolished	

== Extent ==
Saltash South represented the south of the town of Saltash, including the suburb of Wearde and part of the suburb of St Stephens (which was shared with the Saltash West division). The division covered 125 hectares in total.

== Election results ==
=== 2017 election ===
2017 election: Saltash South
Party	Candidate	Votes	%	±%
Liberal Democrats	Hilary Frank	581	52.8	▼16.1
Conservative	Eunice Davis	299	27.2	▼1.9
Independent	Steven Thorn	216	19.6	New
Majority		282	25.6	▼14.2
Rejected ballots		5	0.4	▼1.6
Turnout		1101	35.1	▲4.9
Liberal Democrats hold		Swing		

=== 2013 election ===
2013 election: Saltash South
Party	Candidate	Votes	%	±%
Liberal Democrats	Hilary Frank	685	68.9	
Conservative	Beryl Rosekilly	289	29.1	
Majority		396	39.8	
Rejected ballots		20	2.0	
Turnout		994	30.2	
Liberal Democrats win (new seat)				
