= Polbrock =

Hamlet in north Cornwall, England

Coordinates: 50.491°N 4.802°W

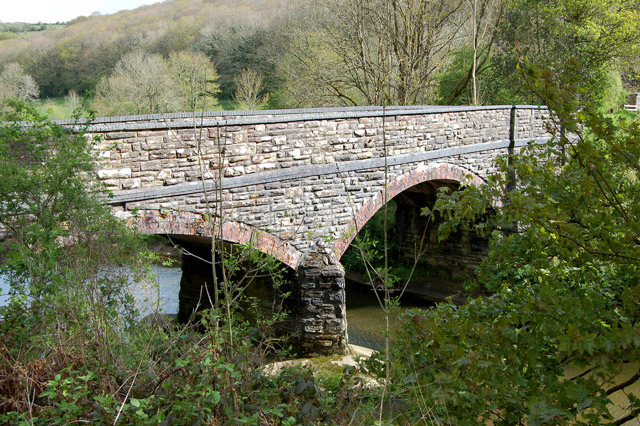
The bridge at Polbrock

Polbrock (Cornish: Polbrogh, meaning badger's pool) is a small hamlet in north Cornwall, England, United Kingdom. It is situated two miles southeast of Wadebridge at grid reference SX 014 695 and near Burlorne Pillow.

Polbrock is situated in the steep-sided and heavily wooded valley of the River Camel and is the site of a pair of bridges carrying a minor road over the River Camel and the Camel Trail. The river bridge is the first road crossing of the River Camel upstream of Wadebridge, and was built in the late 19th Century to replace an earlier footbridge and ford. The next crossing is at Nanstallon two miles further upstream.

Polbrock is on the Camel Trail long-distance footpath and cycle trail. At this point, the Camel Trail follows the trackbed of the former Bodmin and Wadebridge Railway). Polbrock is the first road access point to the Camel Trail when travelling from Wadebridge towards Bodmin. There is a small car park and picnic area from which a footpath leads through Bishop's Wood to Hustyn Mill.

One house in Polbrock, probably built in the 18th century, is Grade II listed by Historic England.
