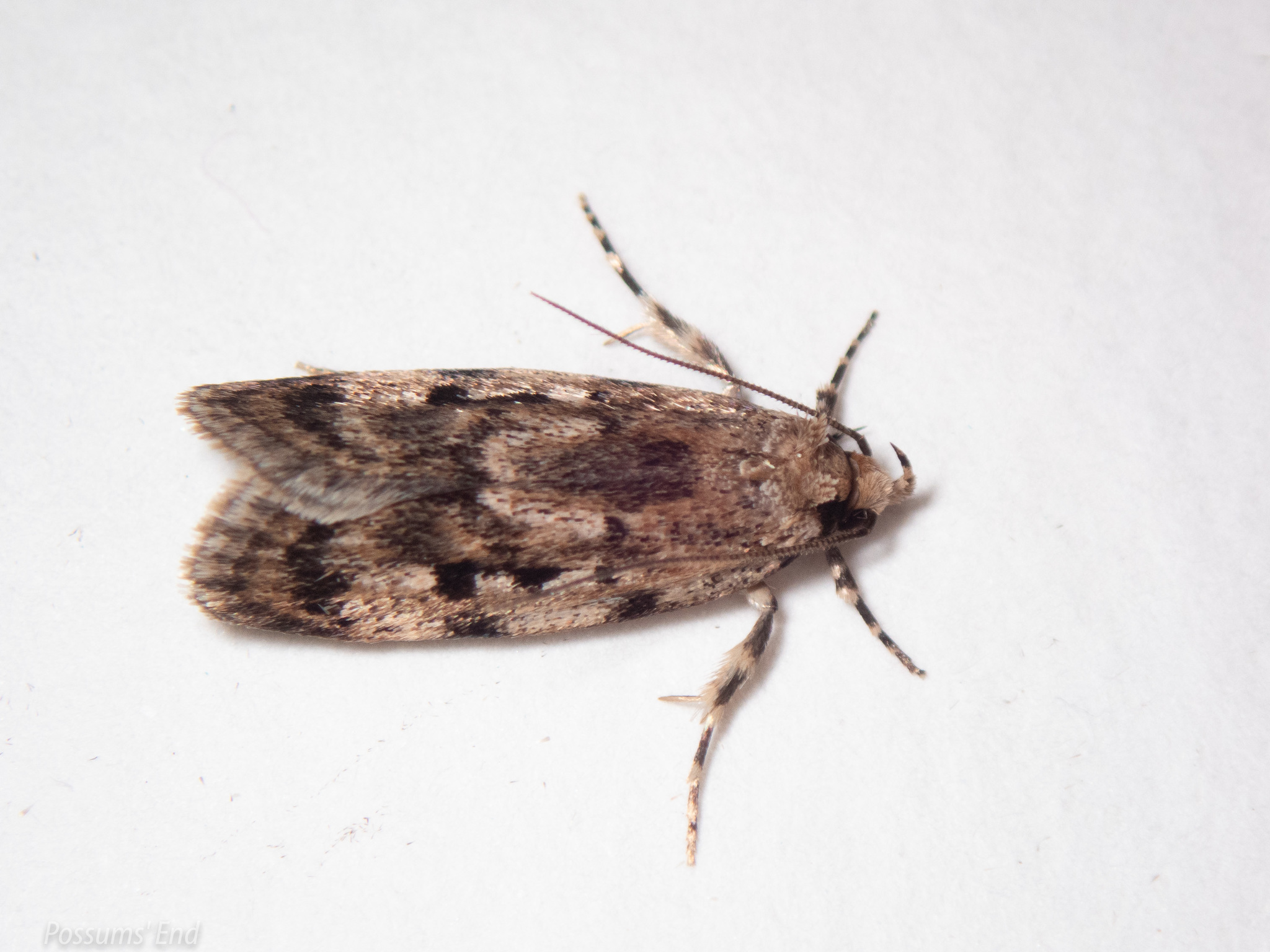

Scientific classification
- Kingdom: Animalia
- Phylum: Arthropoda
- Clade: Pancrustacea
- Class: Insecta
- Order: Lepidoptera
- Family: Oecophoridae
- Genus: Barea
- Species: B. exarcha

Binomial name
- Barea exarcha (Meyrick, 1883)

Synonyms
- Phloeopola exarcha Meyrick, 1883; Izatha planetella Hudson, 1923

= Barea exarcha =

Species of moth

Barea exarcha is a moth of the family Oecophoridae. This species was first described by Edward Meyrick in 1883. It is found in Australia and New Zealand.

Adults are attracted to light and have been collected via a mercury vapour light trap.
