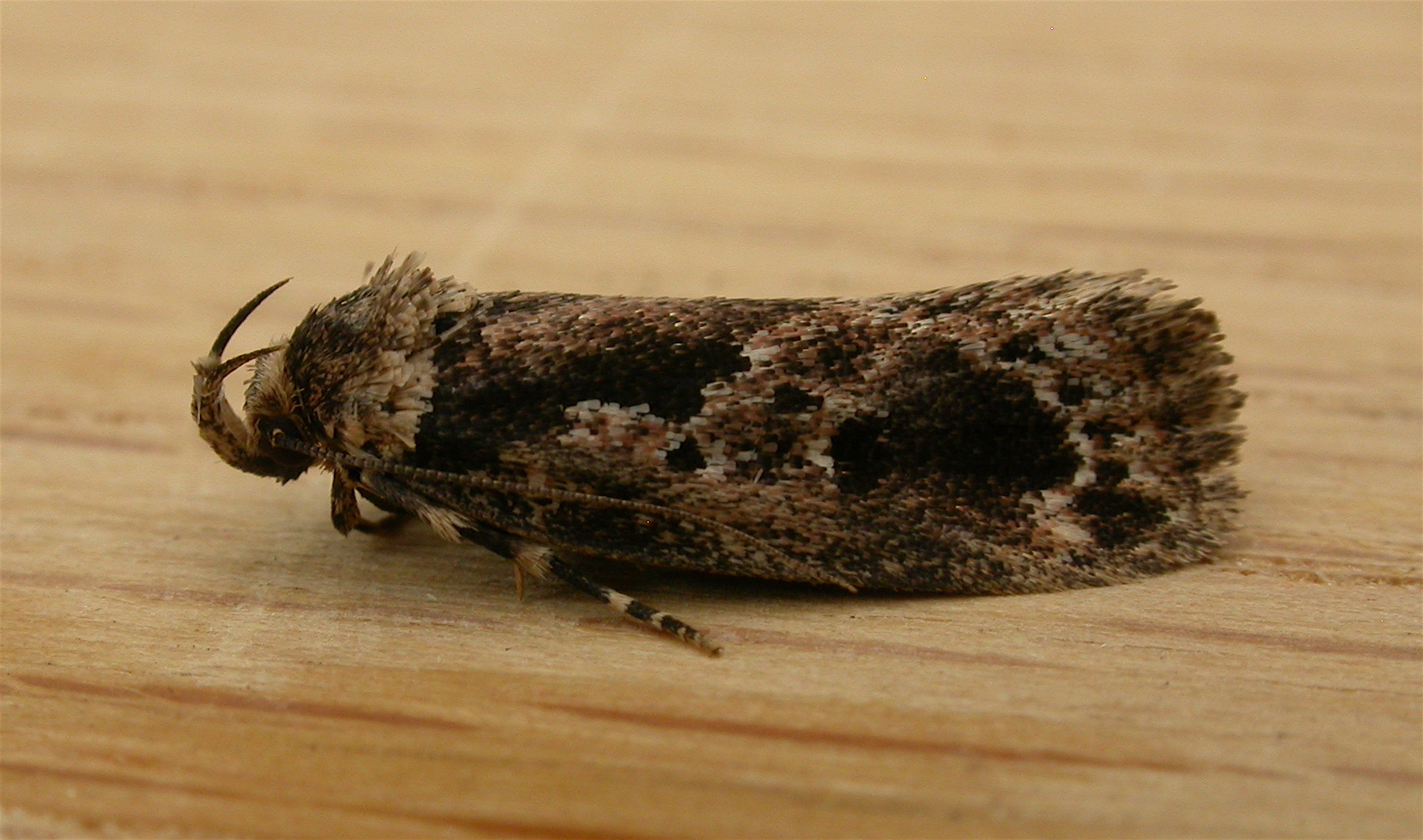

Scientific classification
- Kingdom: Animalia
- Phylum: Arthropoda
- Class: Insecta
- Order: Lepidoptera
- Family: Oecophoridae
- Genus: Barea
- Species: B. consignatella

Binomial name
- Barea consignatella Walker, 1864

= Barea consignatella =

Species of moth

Barea consignatella is a moth of the family Oecophoridae. It is found in Australia and New Zealand. It is brown and has brownish-grey markings.
