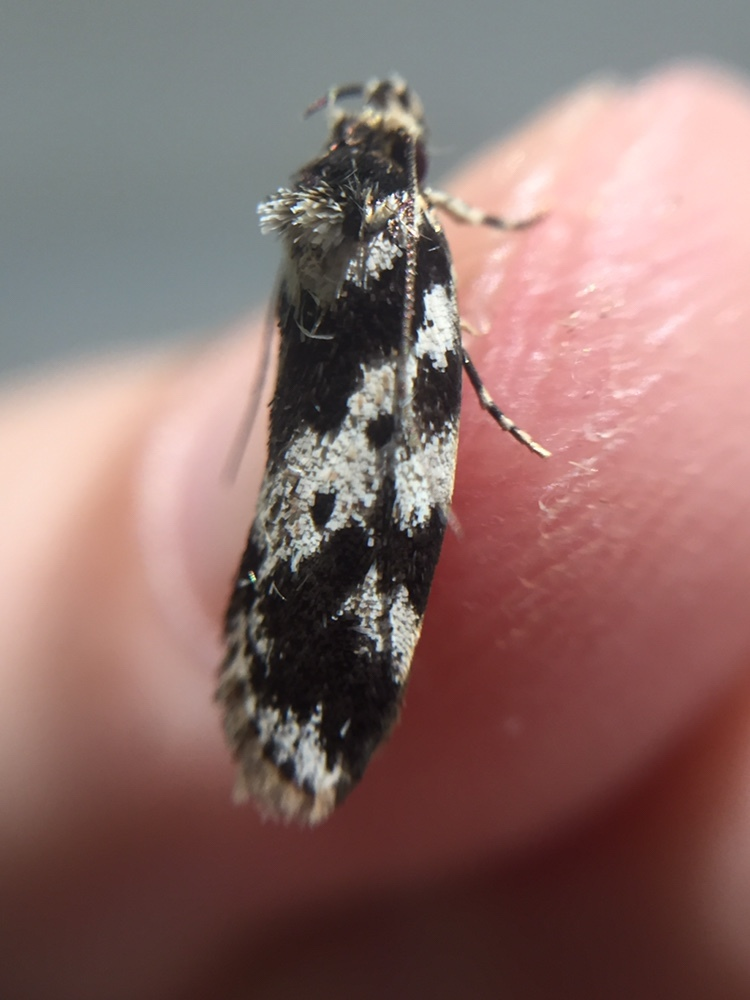

Scientific classification
- Domain: Eukaryota
- Kingdom: Animalia
- Phylum: Arthropoda
- Class: Insecta
- Order: Lepidoptera
- Family: Oecophoridae
- Genus: Barea
- Species: B. confusella

Binomial name
- Barea confusella (Walker, 1864)

Synonyms
- Oecophora confusella Walker, 1864

= Barea confusella =

Species of moth

Barea confusella is a moth of the family Oecophoridae. It was described by Francis Walker in 1864. It is found in New Zealand and Australia in (Queensland, New South Wales and Victoria).

The wingspan is about 20mm.
