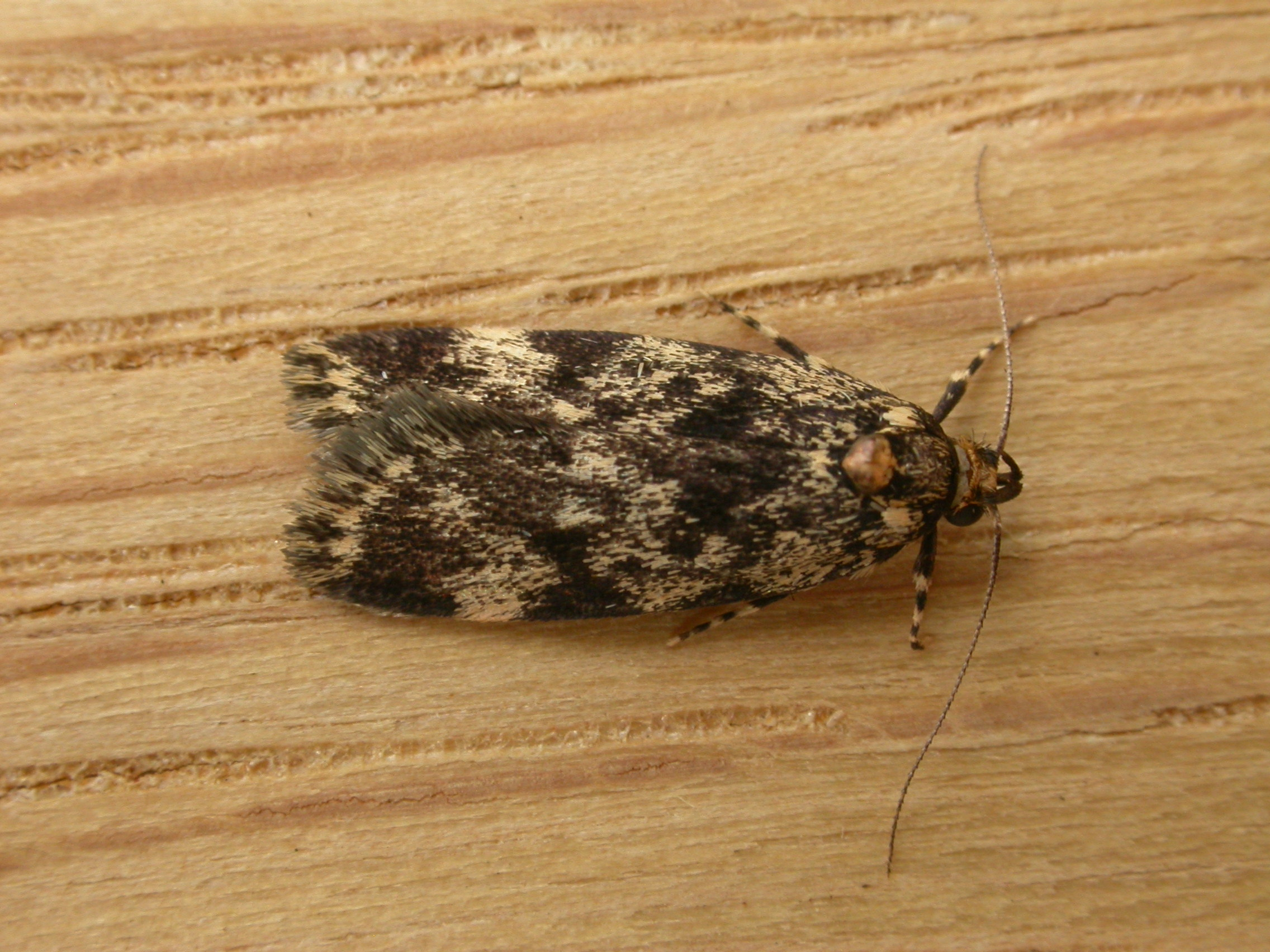

Scientific classification
- Kingdom: Animalia
- Phylum: Arthropoda
- Class: Insecta
- Order: Lepidoptera
- Family: Oecophoridae
- Genus: Barea
- Species: B. codrella

Binomial name
- Barea codrella (Felder & Rogenhofer, 1875)

Synonyms
- Tinea codrella Felder & Rogenhofer, 1875; Phloeopola banausa Meyrick, 1883; Barea banausa (Meyrick, 1883)

= Barea codrella =

Species of moth

Barea codrella, the barea moth, is a moth of the family Oecophoridae. It is found in Australia, more specifically Tasmania, New South Wales and Victoria and South Australia. It is also an adventive species in New Zealand.

== Taxonomy ==
This species was first described by Baron Cajetan von Felder, Rudolf Felder and Alois Friedrich Rogenhofer in 1875 and named Tinea codrella. In 1883 Edward Meyrick, thinking he was describing a new species, named it Phloeopola banausa. In 1988 J. S. Dugdale discussed this species as an undetermined species of Barea.

== Distribution ==
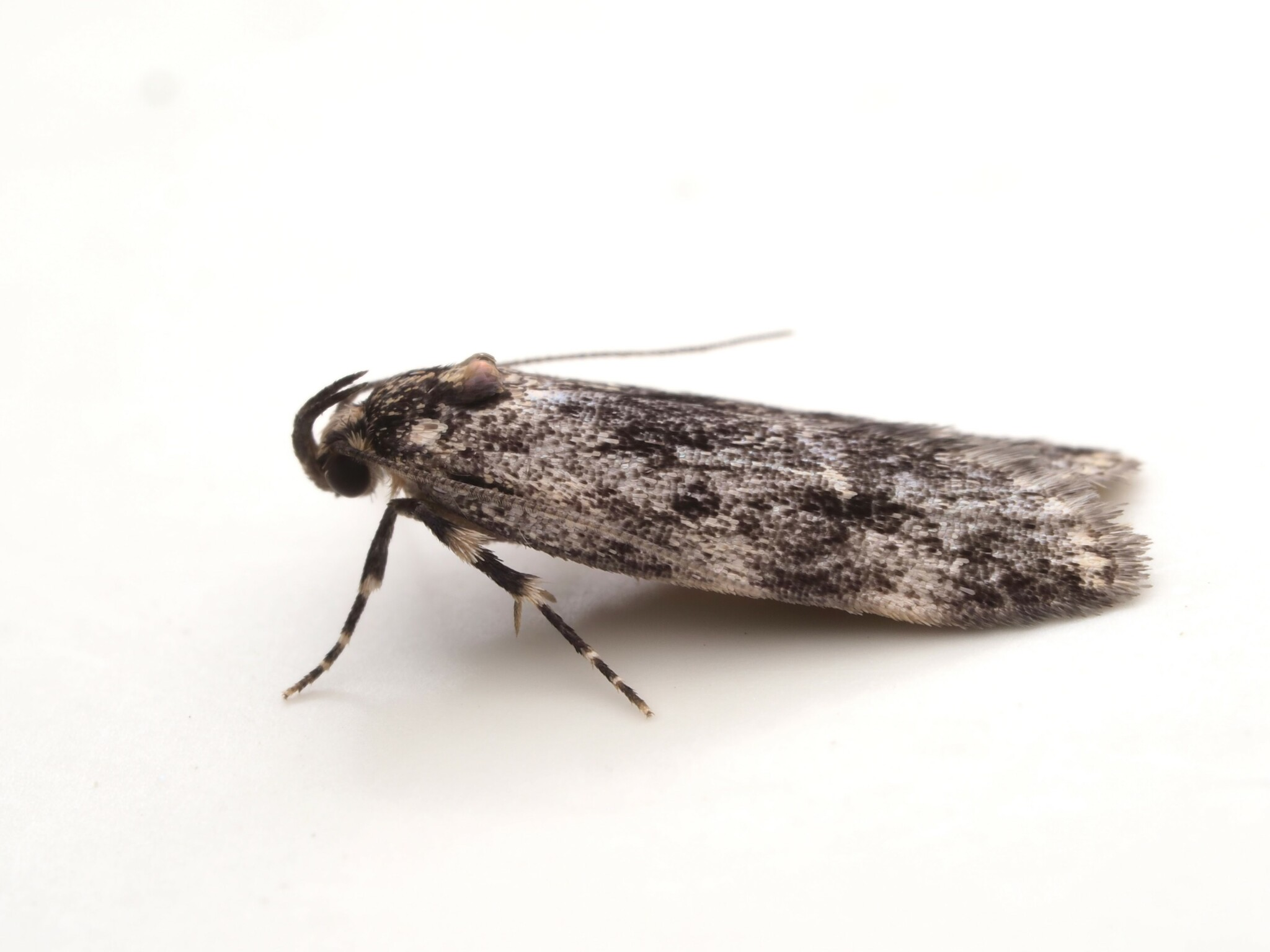
B. codrella.

This species is native to Australia but has been introduced to New Zealand. In Australia it is found in the southern parts of Queensland to Victoria, the southern parts of Western Australia and in Tasmania. In New Zealand B. codrella was first recorded in October 1979 in Hawkes Bay and has since been observed throughout the North Island and in parts of the South Island.

== Description ==
This species is very similar in appearance to several other species found in the Barea genus. Hoare in his 2001 publication stated that B. codrella can be distinguished from the two other Barea species present in New Zealand by

the labial palpi, which are uniformly blackish except for a pale patch on the inner surface of the second segment near the base, and (in fresh specimens) by the presence of a tuft of shining scales on the posterior margin of the thorax.

== Life cycle ==
The larval hosts of B. codrella include species in the genera Eucalyptus and Acacia. The larvae bore into the soft, moist, rotting wood of deceased trees.
