= Burniestrype =

Coordinates: 57.653°N 03.145°W

- Location within Moray
- OS grid reference: NJ3163
- Council area: Moray
- Country: Scotland
- Sovereign state: United Kingdom
- Police: Scotland
- Fire: Scottish
- Ambulance: Scottish

Burniestrype is a hamlet in Moray, Scotland.
