= Bustatoun =

Coordinates: 59.355°N 2.421°W

- Burrian Broch, at the south of the settlement

- Location within Orkney
- OS grid reference: HY760521
- Civil parish: Cross and Burness
- Council area: Orkney
- Lieutenancy area: Orkney
- Country: Scotland
- Sovereign state: United Kingdom
- Post town: ORKNEY
- Postcode district: KW17
- Dialling code: 01856
- Police: Scotland
- Fire: Scottish
- Ambulance: Scottish
- UK Parliament: Orkney and Shetland
- Scottish Parliament: Orkney

Bustatoun is a village on the island of North Ronaldsay, in Orkney, Scotland. The settlement is within the parish of Cross and Burness.
