= Red Post =

Road junction in England

Coordinates: 50.820458°N 4.466344°W

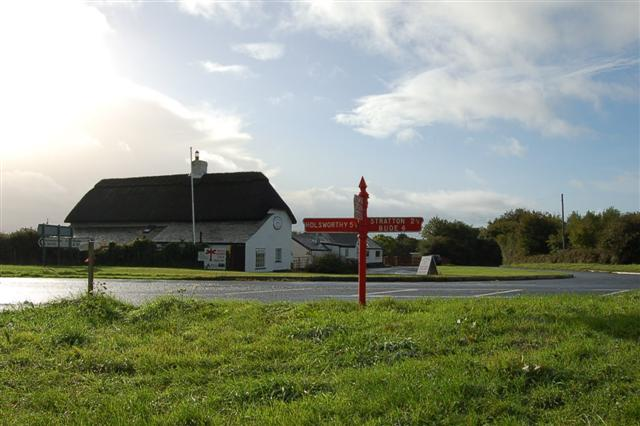
Red Post crossroads

Red Post is a crossroads near Launcells in Cornwall, England. It is on the A3072 Holsworthy to Stratton road where it is crossed by the B3254 road.
