= Butteriss Gate =

Coordinates: 50.152°N 5.194°W

- Location within Cornwall
- OS grid reference: SW719329
- Civil parish: Wendron
- Unitary authority: Cornwall
- Ceremonial county: Cornwall
- Region: South West
- Country: England
- Sovereign state: United Kingdom
- Post town: Penryn
- Postcode district: TR10
- Dialling code: 01326 =
- UK Parliament: Camborne and Redruth

Butteriss Gate is a hamlet in the parish of Wendron, Cornwall, England. Butterriss Gate is 4.5 miles (7.2 km) north-east of Helston and lies on the A394 road that runs from Helston to Penryn.
