= Burscott =

Hamlet in Devon, England

Coordinates: 50.99°N 04.40°W

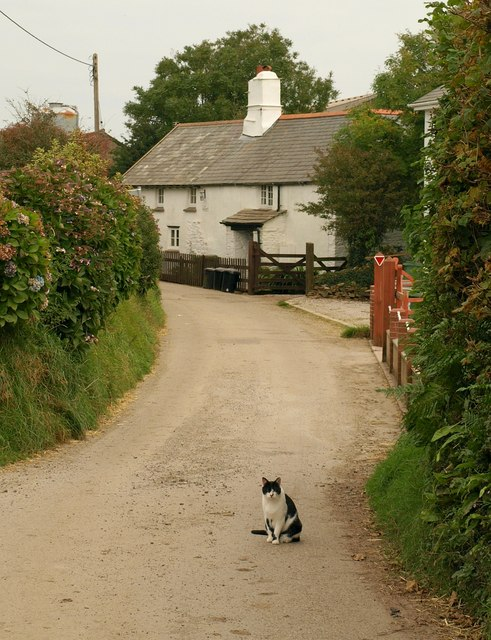
- A cottage in Burscott

- Location within Devon
- OS grid reference: SS3124
- Shire county: Devon
- Region: South West
- Country: England
- Sovereign state: United Kingdom
- Police: Devon and Cornwall
- Fire: Devon and Somerset
- Ambulance: South Western

Burscott is a hamlet in Devon, England.
