= Bursdon =

Hamlet in Devon, England

Coordinates: 50.94°N 04.47°W

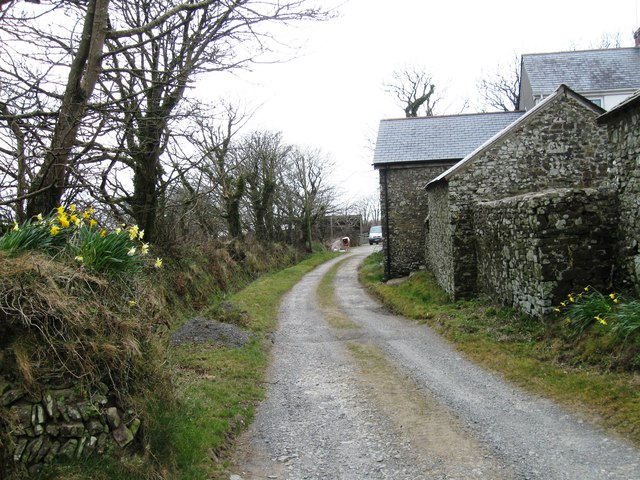

- Location within Devon
- OS grid reference: SS2619
- Shire county: Devon
- Region: South West
- Country: England
- Sovereign state: United Kingdom
- Police: Devon and Cornwall
- Fire: Devon and Somerset
- Ambulance: South Western

Bursdon is a hamlet in Devon, England. It is located very close to the border with Cornwall.
