= Burrastow =

Coordinates: 60°12′51″N 1°36′04″W

Burrastow is a location on the west shore of Vaila Sound near the village of Walls on the Shetland Mainland, Scotland. There are two small piers and the imposing 18th-century Burrastow House. To the east is the bay of Lera Voe and the two small islets of Holm of Breibister and Holm of Burrastow. To the south is Wester Sound, which lies between the mainland and Vaila. The rocky coast contains numerous caves, geos and skerries. Otters and seals are commonly seen offshore.

== See also ==
- List of Shetland islands
