= Bushey Mead =

Coordinates: 51.408415°N 0.223010°W

- Location within Greater London
- London borough: Merton
- Ceremonial county: Greater London
- Region: London
- Country: England
- Sovereign state: United Kingdom
- Post town: LONDON
- Postcode district: SW20
- Dialling code: 020
- Police: Metropolitan
- Fire: London
- Ambulance: London
- London Assembly: Merton and Wandsworth

Bushey Mead is a small district of the London Borough of Merton, forming a small 'ladder' of terraced streets between Wimbledon Chase railway station and Raynes Park railway station. The housing was built in several steps during the period circa 1890 - 1913.
