= Burlestone =

Village in Devon, England

Coordinates: 50.32°N 03.65°W

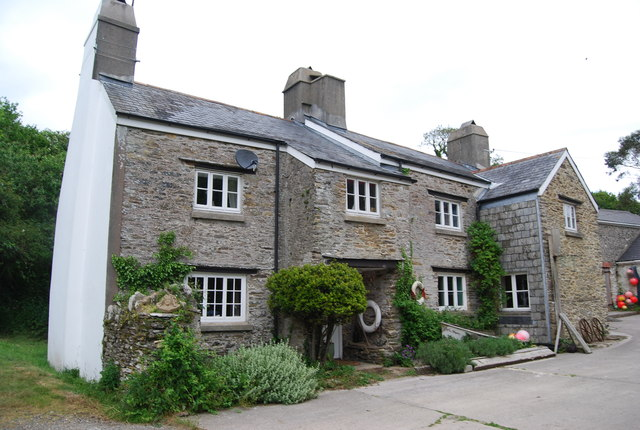
- Lower Burlestone

- Location within Devon
- OS grid reference: SX8248
- Shire county: Devon
- Region: South West
- Country: England
- Sovereign state: United Kingdom
- Police: Devon and Cornwall
- Fire: Devon and Somerset
- Ambulance: South Western

Burlestone is a village in Devon, England.
