= Buttsbear Cross =

Hamlet in Cornwall, England

Coordinates: 50.811°N 4.463°W

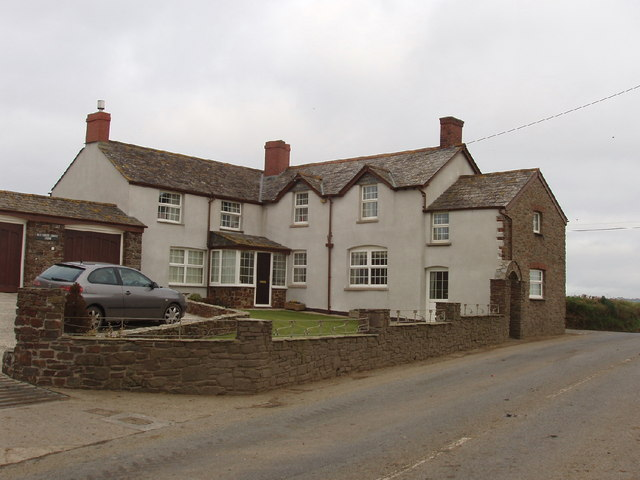
- A farmhouse at Buttsbear Cross

- Location within Cornwall
- OS grid reference: SS2604
- Civil parish: Launcells
- Unitary authority: Cornwall
- Ceremonial county: Cornwall
- Region: South West
- Country: England
- Sovereign state: United Kingdom
- Post town: BUDE
- Postcode district: EX23
- Dialling code: 01288
- UK Parliament: North Cornwall

Buttsbear Cross is a hamlet in the parish of Launcells, Cornwall, England. Buttsbear Cross lies on the B3254 road and is 2.7 miles (4.3 km) south-east of Stratton.
