= Bodieve =

Coordinates: 50.5257°N 4.8328°W

Bodieve: Cornish: Bosyuv
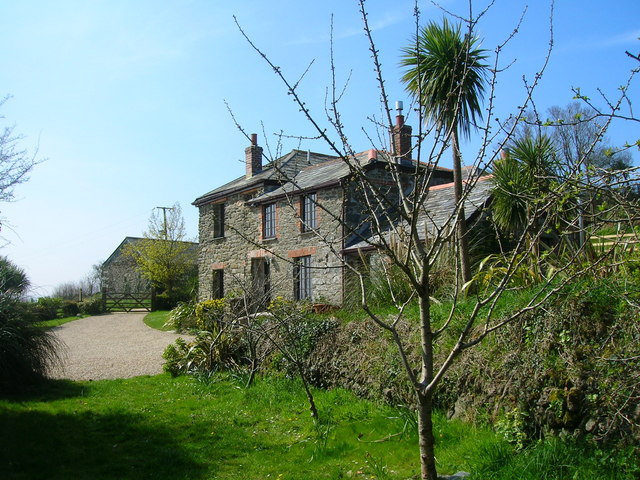
- Footpath on the way to Trentinney

- Location within Cornwall
- OS grid reference: SW9973
- Shire county: Cornwall
- Region: South West
- Country: England
- Sovereign state: United Kingdom
- Post town: Wadebridge
- Postcode district: PL27
- Police: Devon and Cornwall
- Fire: Cornwall
- Ambulance: South Western

Bodieve (Cornish: Bosyuv) is a small village in north Cornwall, England, in the United Kingdom. It is about 1 mile north of Wadebridge (where the 2011 Census population is included) on the B3314 Wadebridge-St Minver road.
