= Burnwynd =

Coordinates: 55.9019°N 3.3907°W

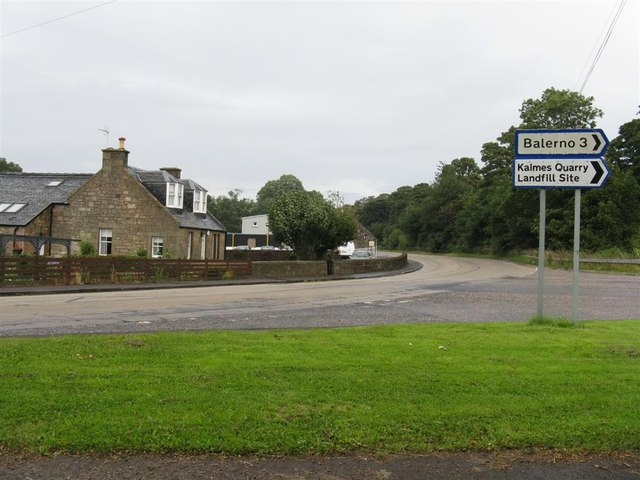
- Road Junction on the A71 at Burnwynd

- Location within West Lothian Location within the City of Edinburgh council area Location within Scotland
- Population: 50
- OS grid reference: NT130685
- Civil parish: Ratho
- Council area: West Lothian
- Country: Scotland
- Sovereign state: United Kingdom
- Post town: KIRKNEWTON
- Postcode district: EH27
- Dialling code: +0044 131 333
- Police: Scotland
- Fire: Scottish
- Ambulance: Scottish
- UK Parliament: Livingston Edinburgh West
- Scottish Parliament: Almond Valley Edinburgh Pentlands

Burnwynd is a village on the border between the City of Edinburgh council area and West Lothian, Scotland. It is situated on the A71 road. Burnwynd is home to approximately twenty houses and also Hatton Tennis Club. Old documents also place Robert Burns in Burnwynd on several trips out of Edinburgh.

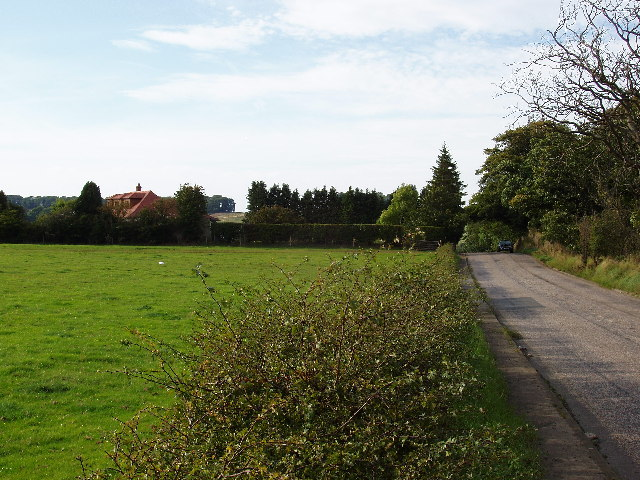
South of Burnwynd
