= Burgois =

Coordinates: 50.51632°N 4.92574°W

Burgois: Cornish: Borrgos
- Location within Cornwall
- OS grid reference: SW9272
- Shire county: Cornwall
- Region: South West
- Country: England
- Sovereign state: United Kingdom
- Post town: Wadebridge
- Postcode district: PL27
- Police: Devon and Cornwall
- Fire: Cornwall
- Ambulance: South Western
- UK Parliament: North Cornwall

Not to be confused with Bourgeoisie

Burgois (Cornish: Borrgos, meaning Wooded Protuberance) is a hamlet in north Cornwall, England, United Kingdom situated approximately one mile south of Padstow. It is 5 miles west of the town of Wadebridge.

The hamlet has a pub, the Pickwick Inn, but no other community facilities. It is within the Church of England parish of St Issey and the St Issey and St Tudy division of Cornwall Council.
