= Buryas Bridge =

Hamlet in Cornwall, England

Coordinates: 50°06′19″N 5°34′36″W

Buryas Bridge: Cornish: Nansberres
- Hamlet
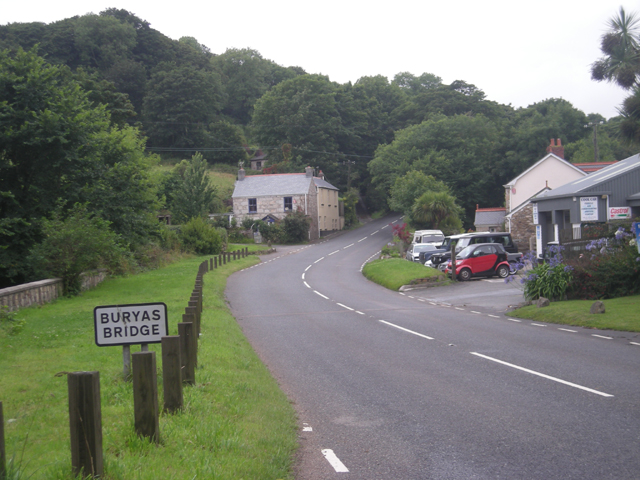

- Location within Cornwall
- Unitary authority: Cornwall
- Region: South West
- Country: England
- Sovereign state: United Kingdom
- Police: Devon and Cornwall
- Fire: Cornwall
- Ambulance: South Western

Buryas Bridge (Cornish: Nansberres, meaning valley of the short ford) is a hamlet on the A30 between Land's End and Penzance in west Cornwall, England, UK.

== History ==
The hamlet and bridge are on the modern A30 road, which was originally the route between Penzance and the early medieval monastic centre at St Buryan. The route is marked by several surviving medieval wayside crosses including one at Trembath, 200 m to the east. The bridge became a ″County Bridge″, maintained by the County in 1774 when Justices were told that the ancient and common bridge on the boundary between the parishes of Madron and Paul was in decay. A plan and the rebuild of the bridge was produced by John Dennis at the expense of the County.

== Geography ==
About 1 km upstream of Buryas Bridge is the Drift Reservoir, which was built between 1959 and 1961, and provides water to west Cornwall. Below the hamlet, the river flows south-east towards Newlyn and Mount's Bay.
