= Burlawn =

Hamlet in Cornwall, England

Coordinates: 50°29′38″N 4°49′24″W

Burlawn: Cornish: Boselowen
- Hamlet
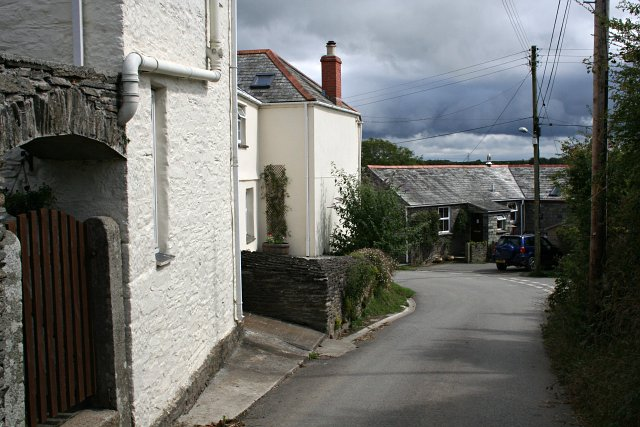

- Location within Cornwall
- Unitary authority: Cornwall
- Region: South West
- Country: England
- Sovereign state: United Kingdom
- Police: Devon and Cornwall
- Fire: Cornwall
- Ambulance: South Western

Burlawn (Cornish: Boselowen, meaning dwelling of the elm tree) is a hamlet in the parish of St Breock, Cornwall, England, UK.

== History ==
There are two listed buildings in Burlawn. 1 and 2 Meadowside are late 16th century and were originally a single dwelling. Burlawn Eglos farmhouse also dates to the late 16th or early 17th century and both it and the adjacent barn are described in a single listing.
