= Burraton Coombe =

Coordinates: 50.411°N 4.237°W

Burraton Coombe: Cornish: Komm Trewerin
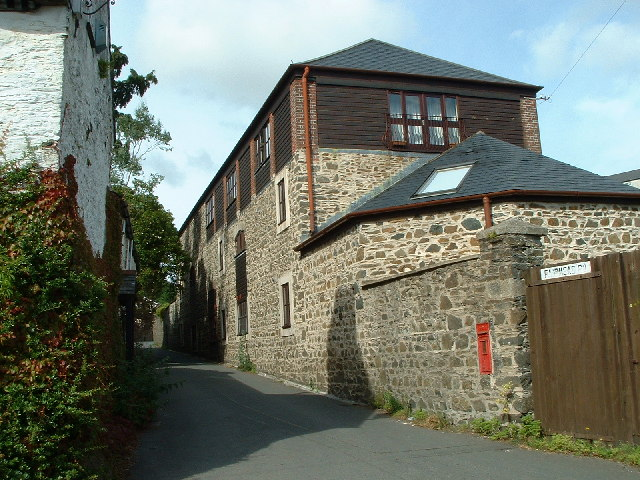
- A former tannery, Burraton Coombe, Saltash

- Location within Cornwall
- OS grid reference: SX411591
- Civil parish: Saltash
- Unitary authority: Cornwall
- Ceremonial county: Cornwall
- Region: South West
- Country: England
- Sovereign state: United Kingdom
- Post town: SALTASH
- Postcode district: PL12
- Dialling code: 01752
- UK Parliament: South East Cornwall

Burraton Coombe (Cornish: Komm Trewerin) is a village forming a suburb on the west side of Saltash in Cornwall, England.
