= Butterwick, County Durham =

Village in County Durham, England

Coordinates: 54°39′42″N 1°24′06″W

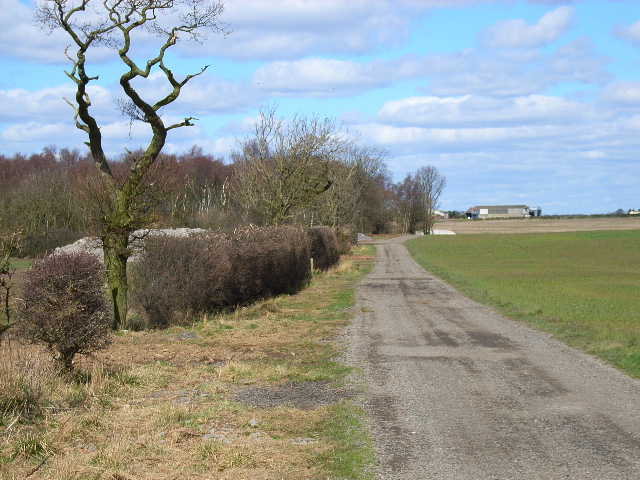
Farm road to Butterwick Moor Farm

Butterwick is a small village in County Durham, England. It is situated a short distance to the southeast of Fishburn.

Butterwick is first mentioned in 1131, when it was called 'Boterwyck' meaning the butter or dairy farm. The West, South and East Butterwick Farms of today are the surviving remnants of this small medieval village, the earthwork remains of which still survive in and around the modern farm buildings.
