= Burlorne Tregoose =

Coordinates: 50.488°N 4.805°W

Burlorne Tregoose: Cornish: Boselowen Tregoos
- Location within Cornwall
- OS grid reference: SX011692
- Civil parish: St Breock
- Unitary authority: Cornwall Council
- Ceremonial county: Cornwall
- Region: South West
- Country: England
- Sovereign state: United Kingdom
- Post town: WADEBRIDGE
- Postcode district: PL30
- Dialling code: 01208
- Police: Devon and Cornwall
- Fire: Cornwall
- Ambulance: South Western
- UK Parliament: North Cornwall

Burlorne Tregoose (Cornish: Boselowen Tregoos, meaning woodland farm of the elm tree dwelling) is a hamlet in the parish of St Breock, Cornwall, England, UK.
