= List of people from Iowa =

State flag of Iowa

Location of Iowa in the United States

This is a list of notable people who were born in or closely associated with the American state of Iowa. People not born in Iowa are marked with §.

== A ==
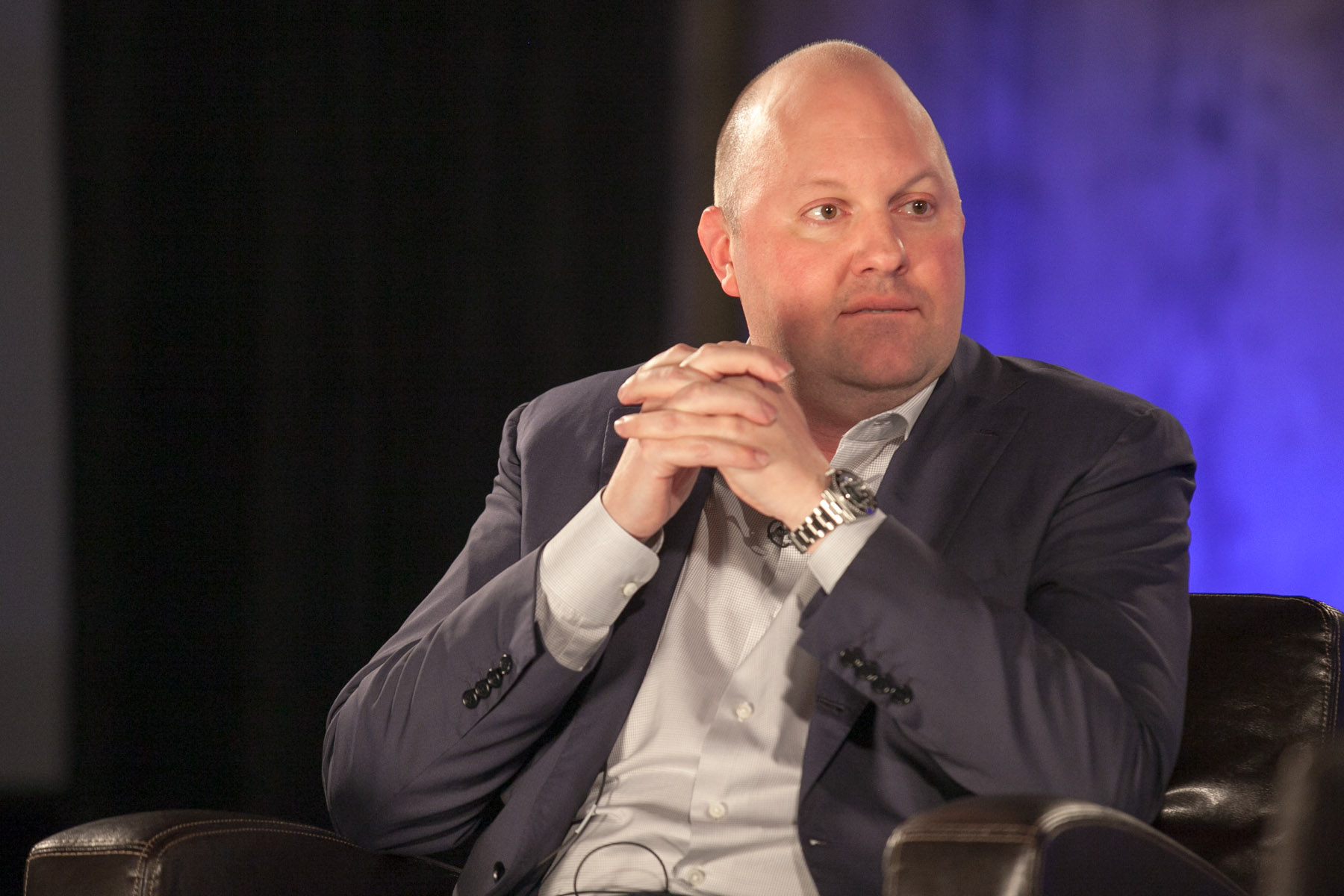
Marc Andreessen

Cap Anson

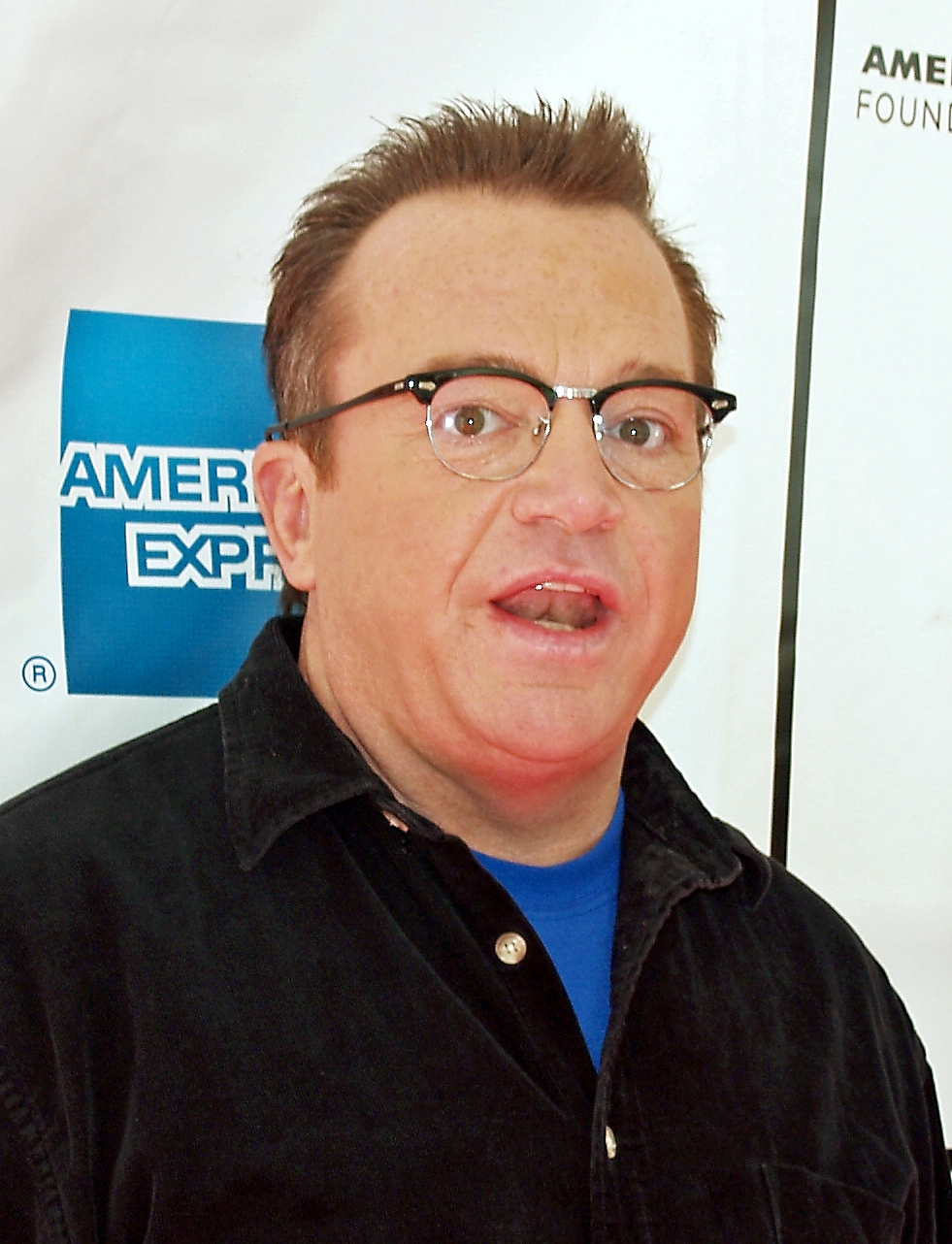
Tom Arnold

- Dudley W. Adams, horticulturalist
- John T. Adams, former Republican committee head
- Julie Adams, actress
- Kareem Al Allaf (born 1998), American tennis player who has played for Syria and the US
- Trev Alberts, football player
- Bess Streeter Aldrich, author
- James Allen, engineer
- Fran Allison, television personality
- William B. Allison, politician
- Betty Baxter Anderson, author
- Lew Anderson, actor
- Rudolph Martin Anderson, explorer
- Marc Andreessen, software engineer
- Pat Angerer, football player
- Cap Anson, baseball player
- Appanoose, 19th-century Meskwaki chief
- Lloyd Appleton, Olympic freestyle wrestler
- Samuel Z. Arkoff, film producer
- Herbert W. Armstrong, religious leader
- Tom Arnold, actor
- Matthew Ashford, actor
- Winifred Asprey, mathematician
- John Vincent Atanasoff, § inventor
- Jim Aton, jazz musician, composer, singer

== B ==
=== Ba–Bk ===
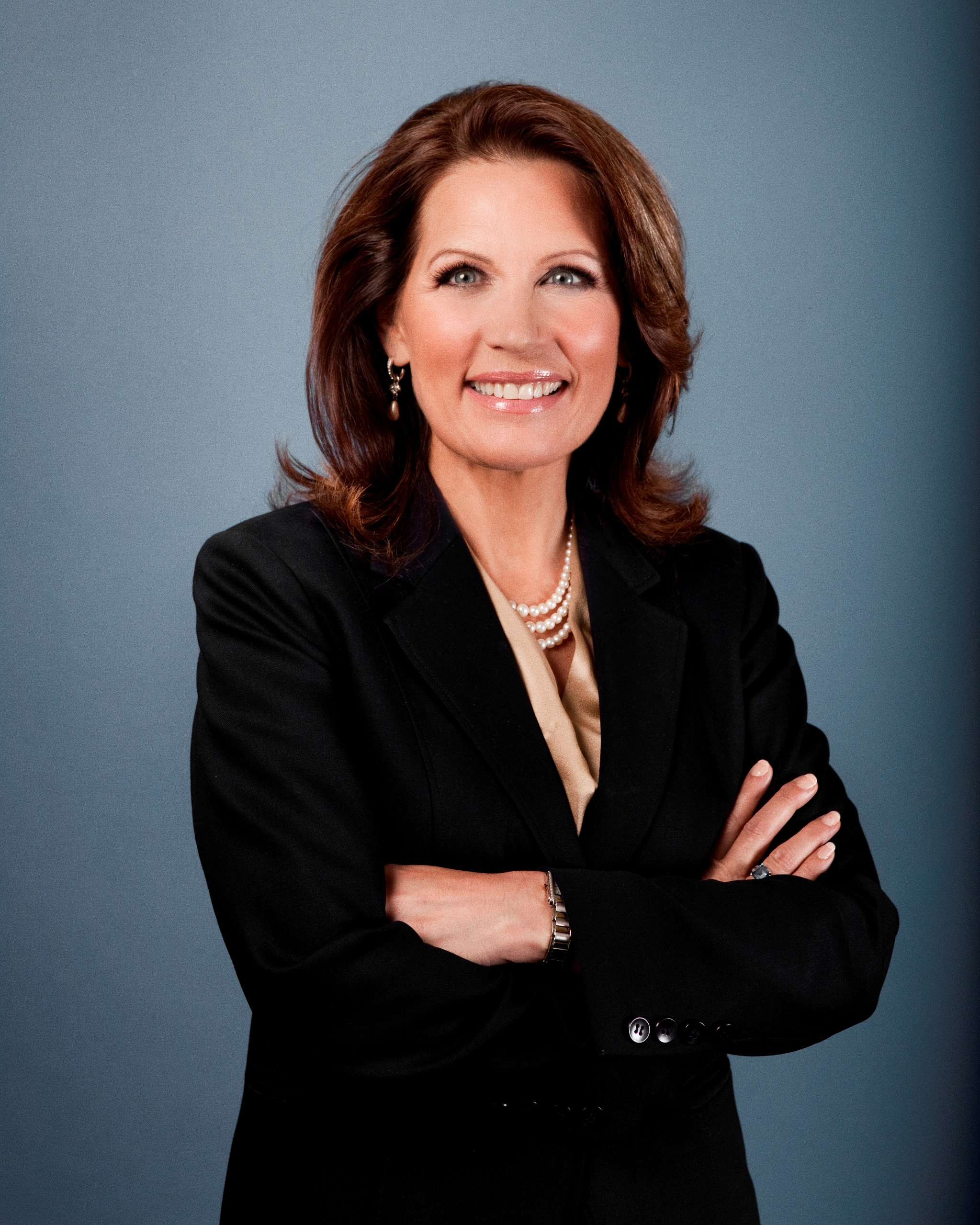
Michele Bachmann

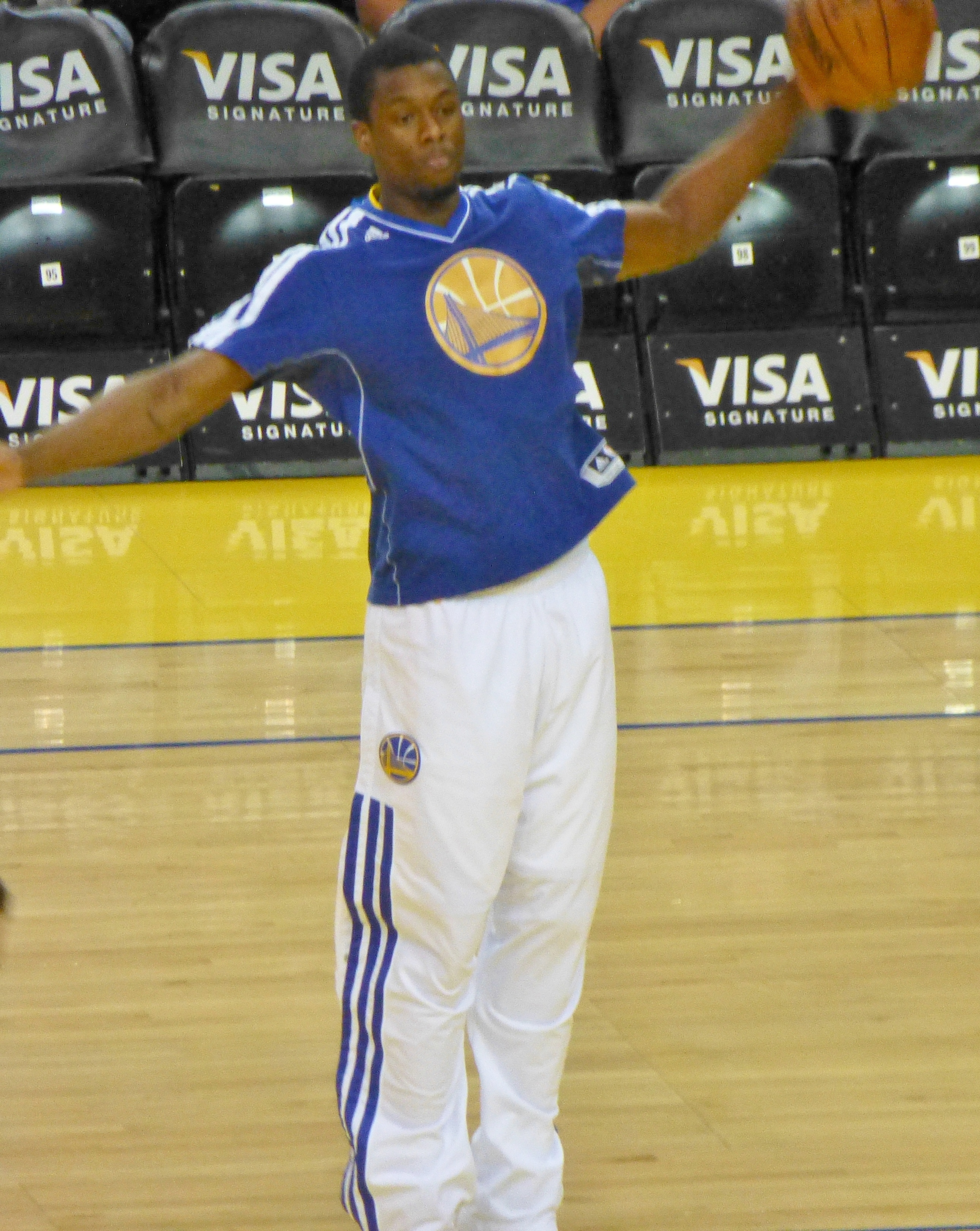
Harrison Barnes

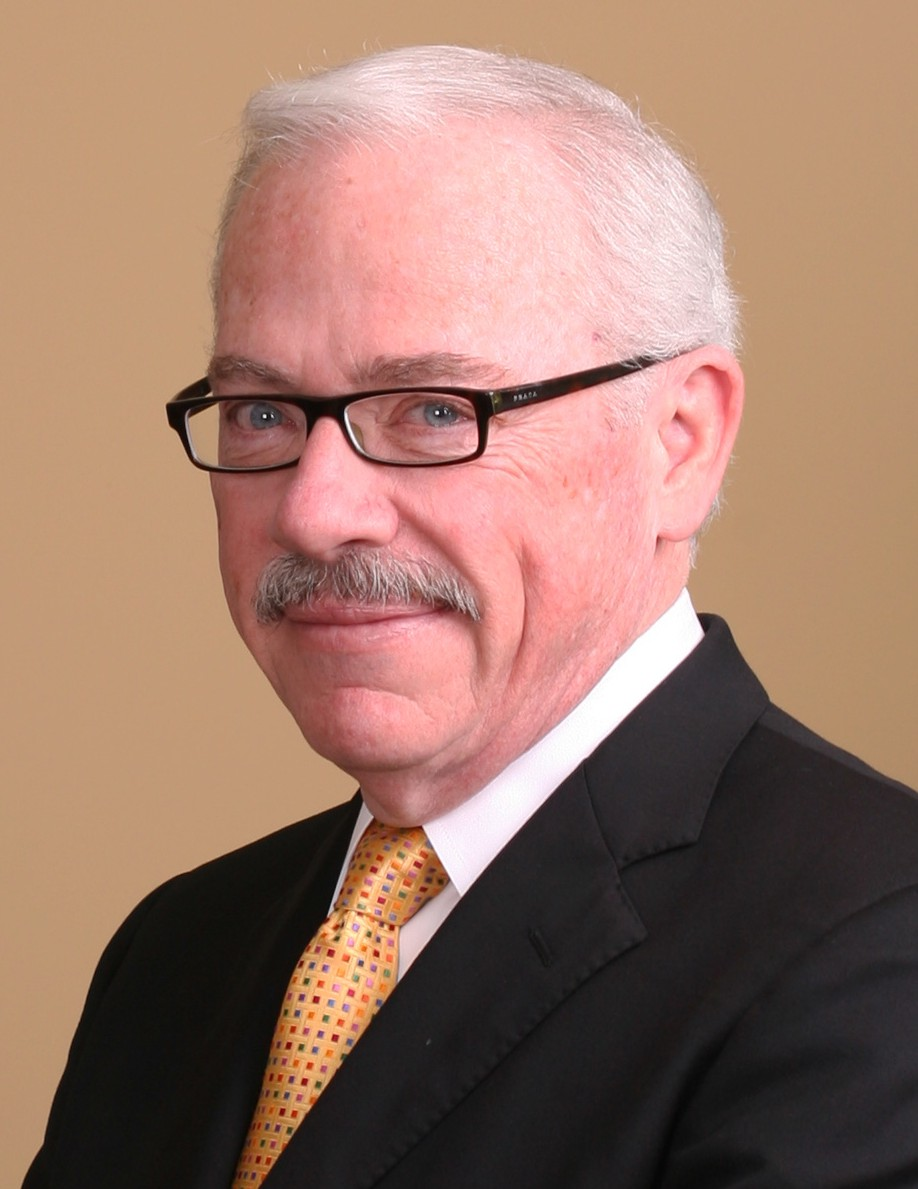
Bob Barr

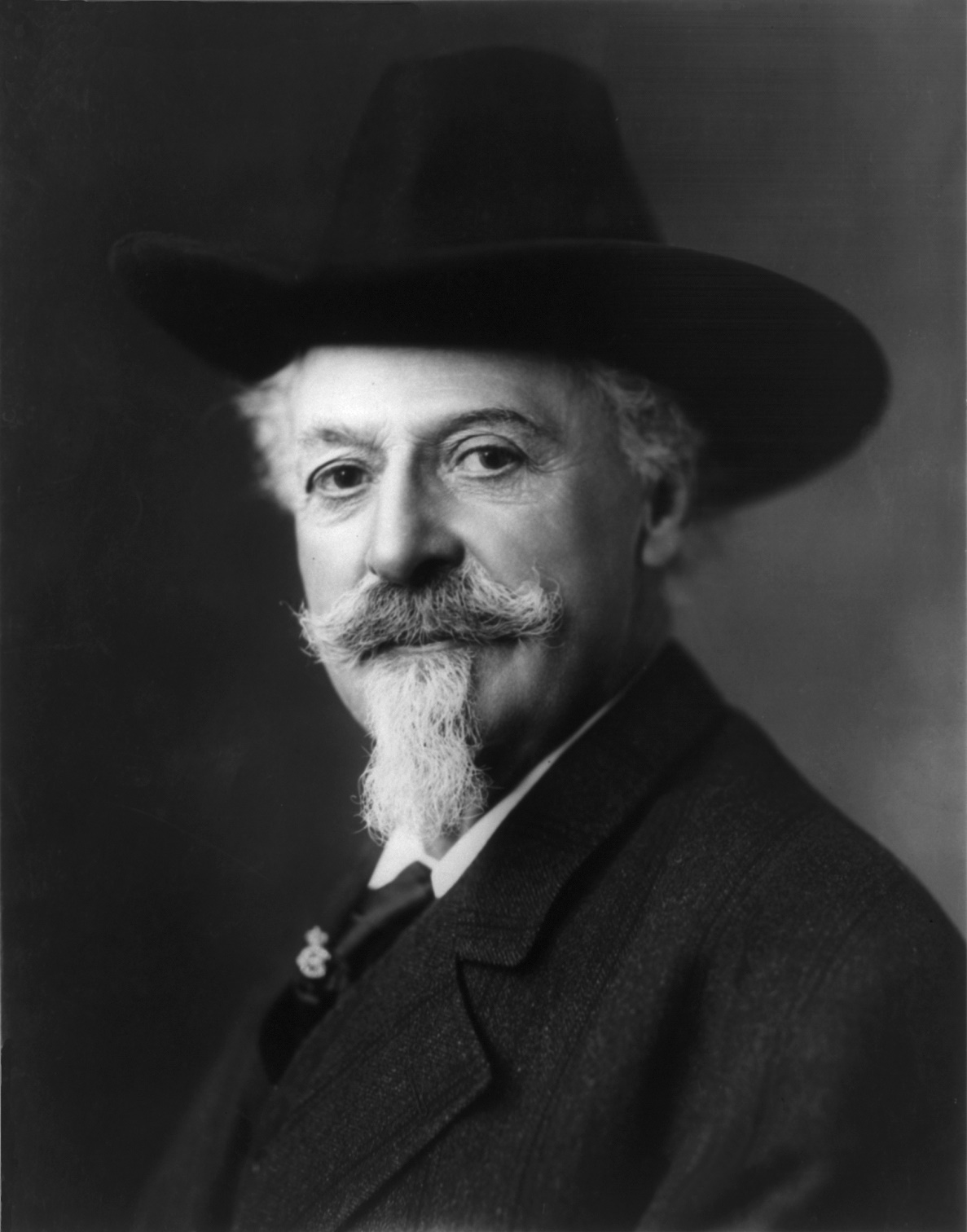
Buffalo Bill

- John Babcock, Olympic freestyle wrestler
- Michele Bachmann, politician
- Oliver Baez Bendorf, poet
- Stan Bahnsen, baseball player
- John O. Bailey, judge
- Bil Baird, puppeteer
- Betsy Baker, actress
- Nathaniel B. Baker, politician
- Alvin Baldus, politician
- Brad Banks, athlete
- Hal C. Banks, labor leader
- Jill Banner, actress
- Antonine Barada, folk hero
- Roger Barkley, broadcaster
- Harrison Barnes, athlete
- Bob Barr, politician
- Douglas Barr, actor, writer, and director
- David Barrett, football player
- Steve Bartkowski, football player
- Robert Bartley, editor of The Wall Street Journal
- Clint Barton, fictional character
- Theodore J. Bauer, scientist
- Lansing Hoskins Beach, Army officer
- Bennett Bean, artist
- Carl L. Becker, historian
- Bix Beiderbecke, jazz musician
- William W. Belknap
- Brian Bell, musician
- Alfred S. Bennett, Army general and U.S. secretary of war
- Duane Benson, athlete
- Matt Bentley, professional wrestler
- Christian Beranek, writer, actor, and producer
- Leo Beranek, acoustician
- Bill Bergan, coach
- Eddie Berlin, athlete
- Dan Bern, musician
- Jennie Iowa Berry, clubwoman
- S. Torriano Berry, film producer, writer, director
- Jay Berwanger, football player
- Stanley Biber, physician
- Greg Biekert, football player
- Leo Binz, § Roman Catholic archbishop
- Joe Bisenius, athlete
- Richard Pike Bissell, author
- Nate Bjorkgren, basketball coach

=== Bl–Bz ===
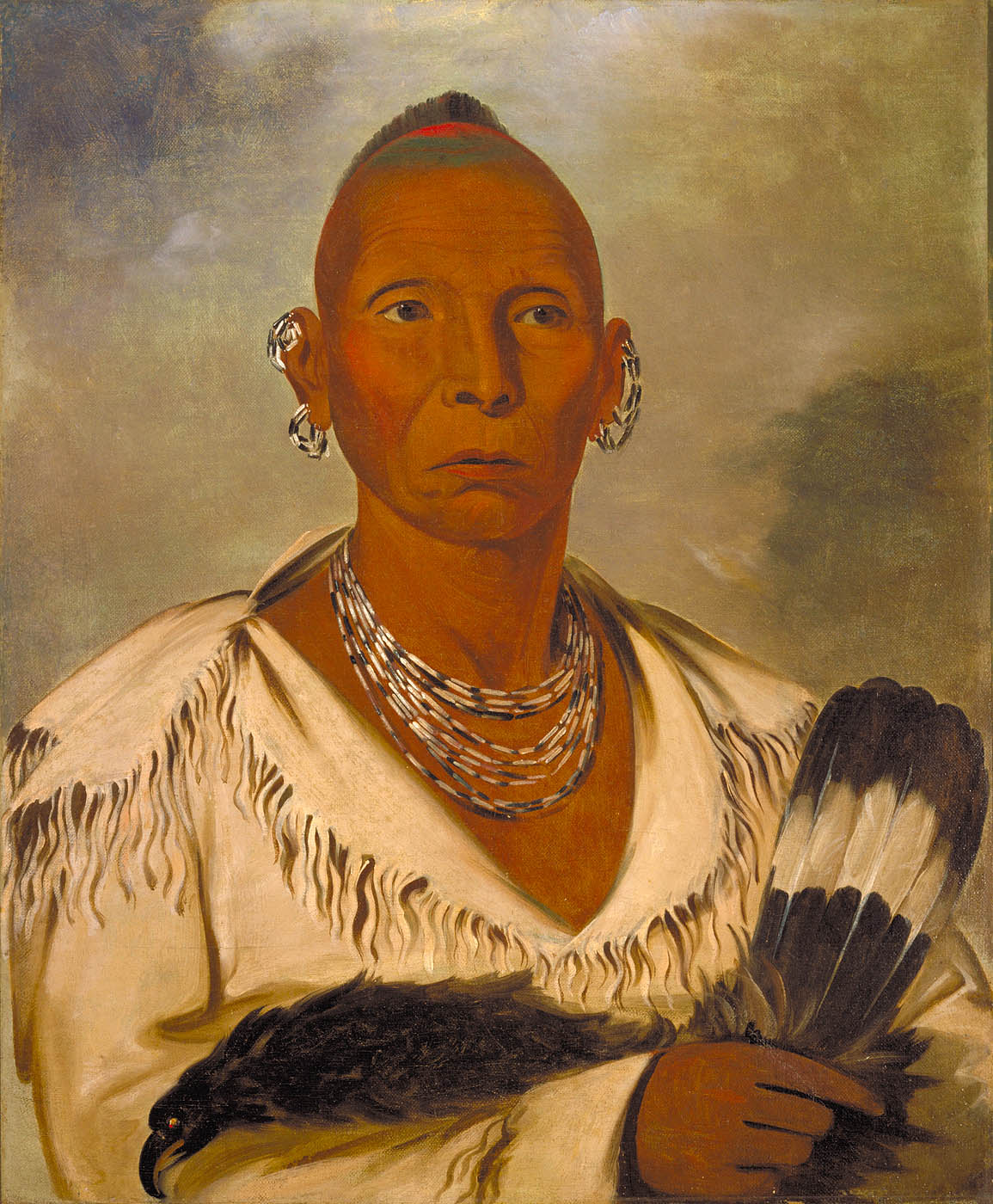
Black Hawk

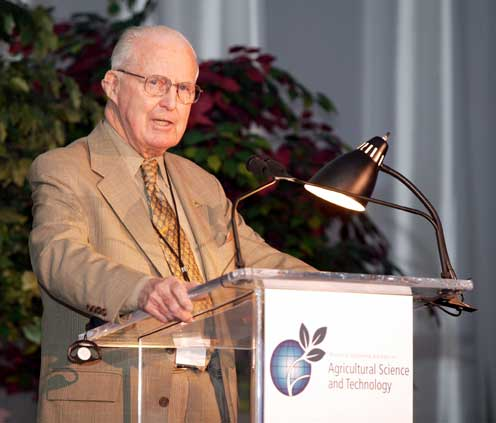
Norman Borlaug

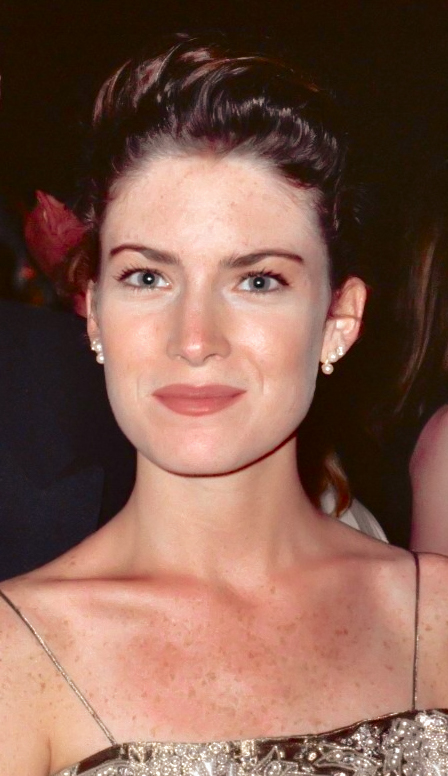
Lara Flynn Boyle

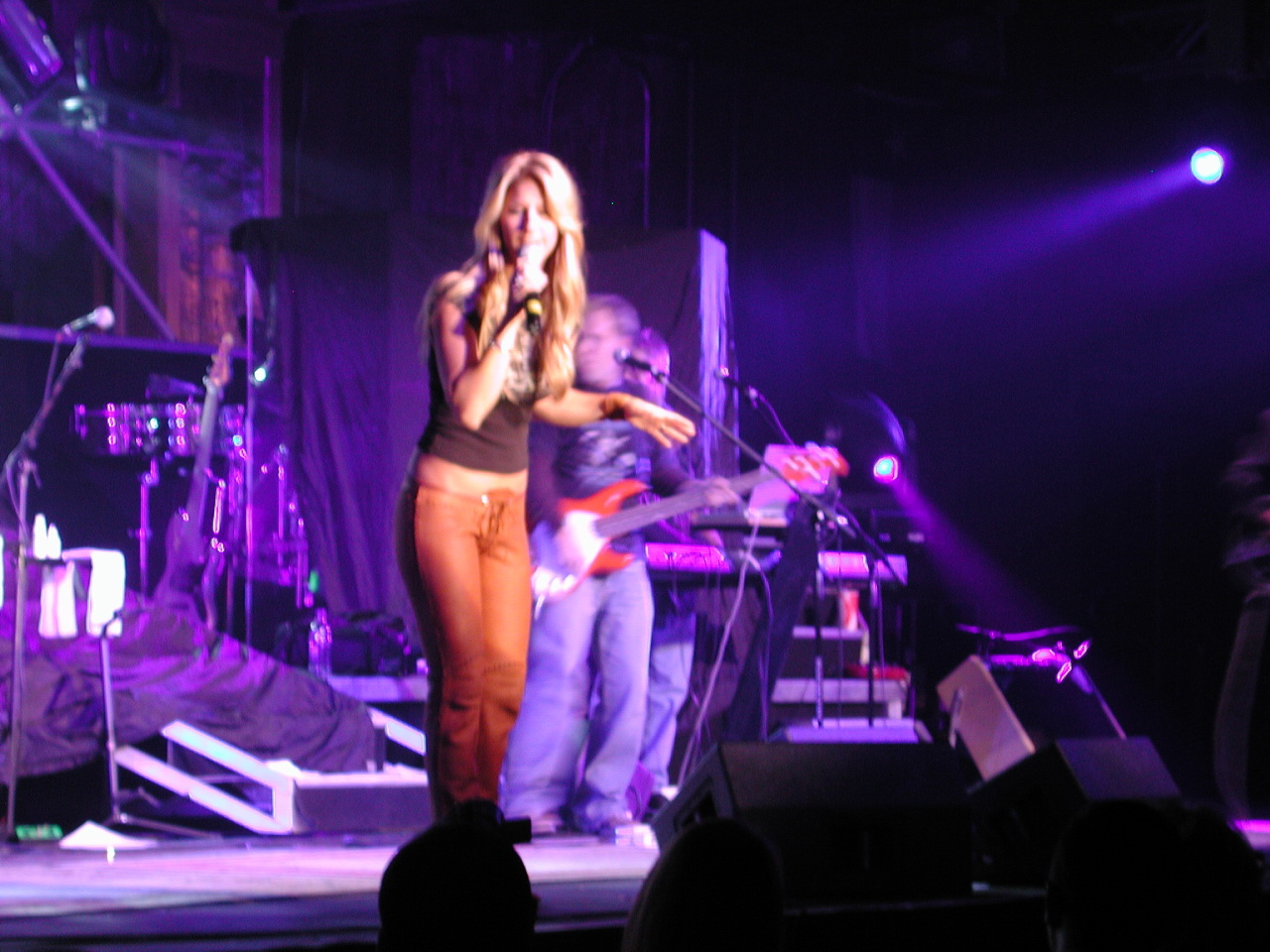
Shannon Brown

- Black Hawk, § Native American chief
- Casey Blake, baseball player
- Gordon Blake, military general
- Donald G. Bloesch, theologian
- Isabel Bloom, artist
- Scott Bloomquist, auto racer
- Mike Blouin, politician
- Lisa Bluder, coach
- Mike Boddicker, baseball player
- Ike Boettger, American football player
- Bill Bogaard, politician
- Tommy Bolin, musician
- Norman Borlaug, agricultural scientist and Nobel laureate
- Rob Borsellino, writer
- Ryan Bowen, athlete
- Thomas M. Bowen, politician
- Charles Bowers, cartoonist and comic actor
- Lara Flynn Boyle, actress
- Eleanor Hoyt Brainerd, author
- Glen Brand, Olympic freestyle wrestler
- Neville Brand, actor
- Terry Brands, Olympic freestyle wrestler, wrestling coach
- Tom Brands, Olympic freestyle wrestler, wrestling coach
- Terry E. Branstad, politician
- Aaron Brant, athlete
- Charles Wesley Brashares, Methodist bishop
- Titus Bronson, founder of Kalamazoo, Michigan
- Greg Brown, folk musician
- Mace Brown, athlete
- Shannon Brown, country music singer
- Bruce Brubaker, pianist, record producer
- Rob Bruggeman, athlete
- Bill Bryson, author
- Oliver E. Buckley, electrical engineer
- Matt Bullard, athlete
- Ambrose Burke, priest, college president
- Jerry Burke, musician
- Tim Burke, football coach
- Joseph A. A. Burnquist, politician
- Martin Burns, athlete
- Joe Burrow, Heisman Trophy winner
- Jim Burt, sportscaster
- Marion LeRoy Burton, college president
- Harlan J. Bushfield, politician
- Mike Butcher, baseball player
- Frank M. Byrne, politician
- Robert Byrne, author

== C ==
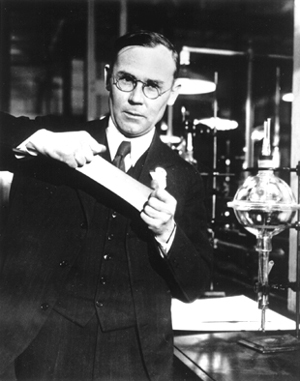
Wallace Carothers

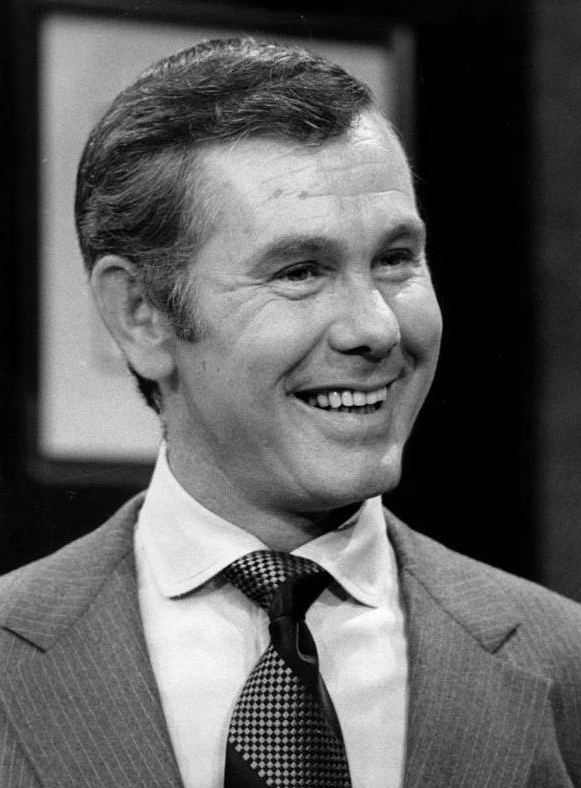
Johnny Carson

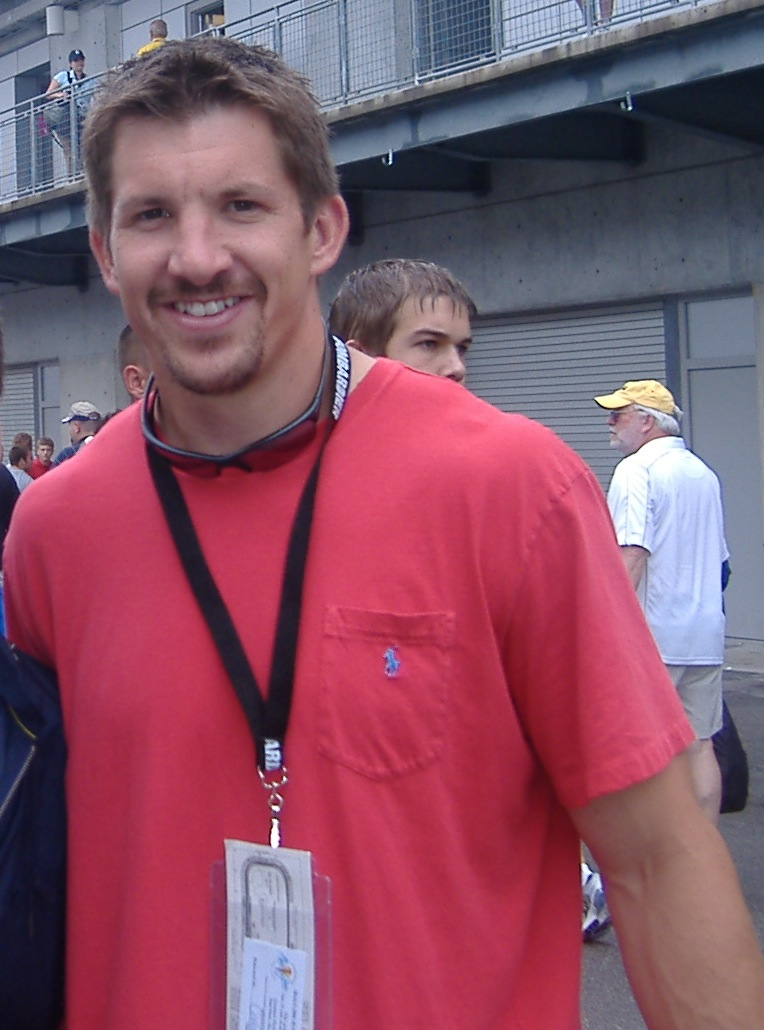
Dallas Clark, §

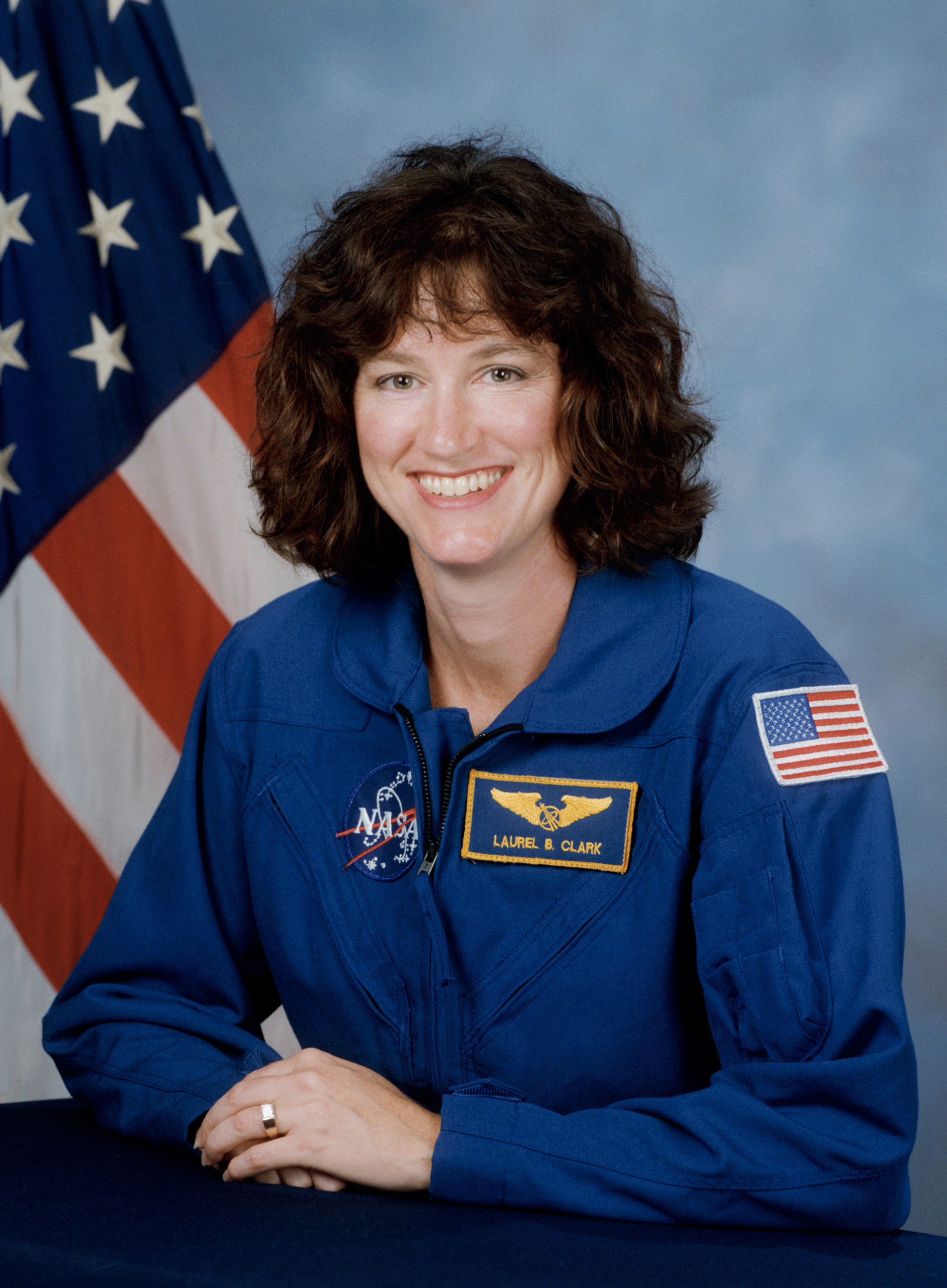
Laurel Clark

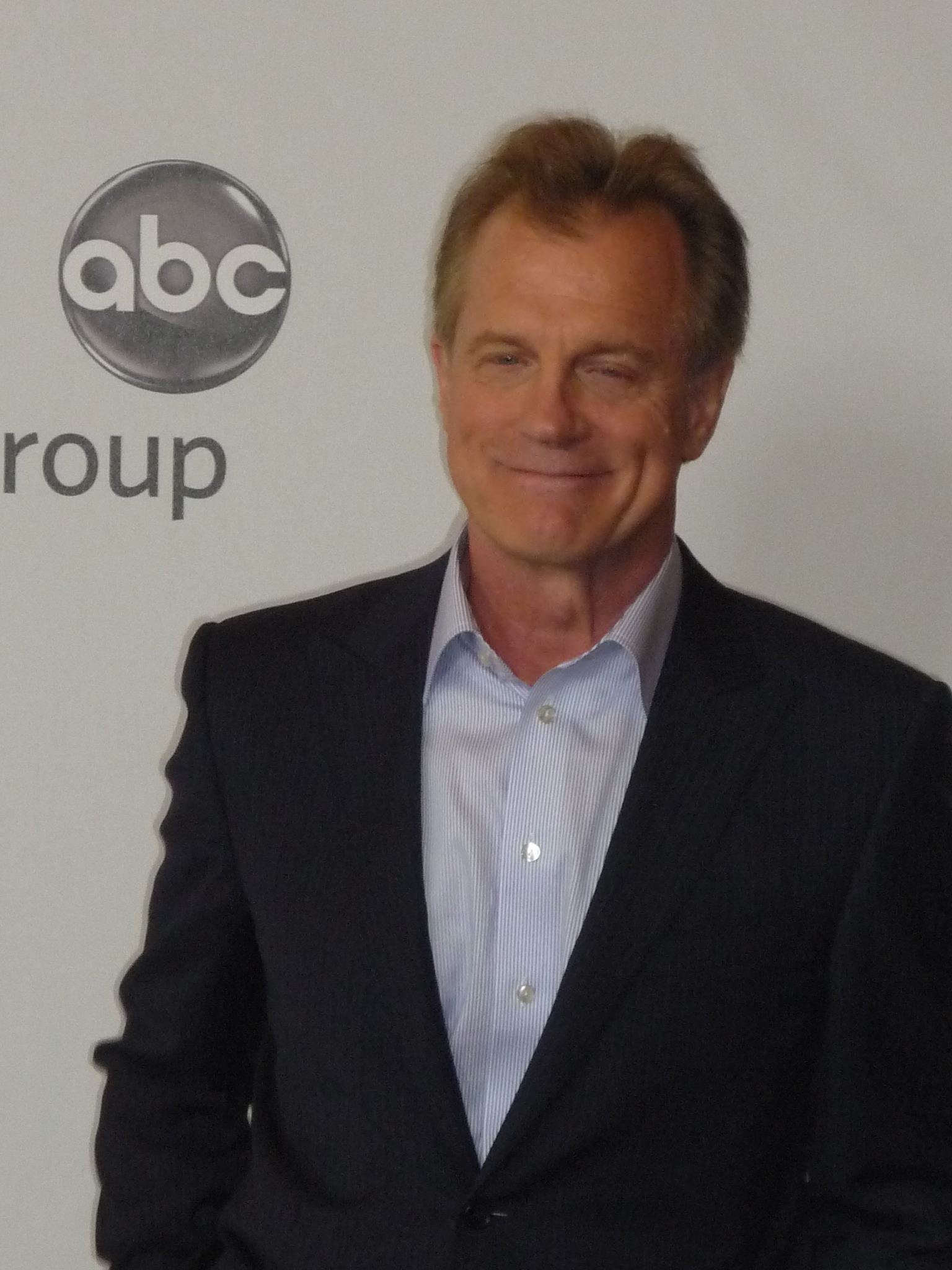
Stephen Collins

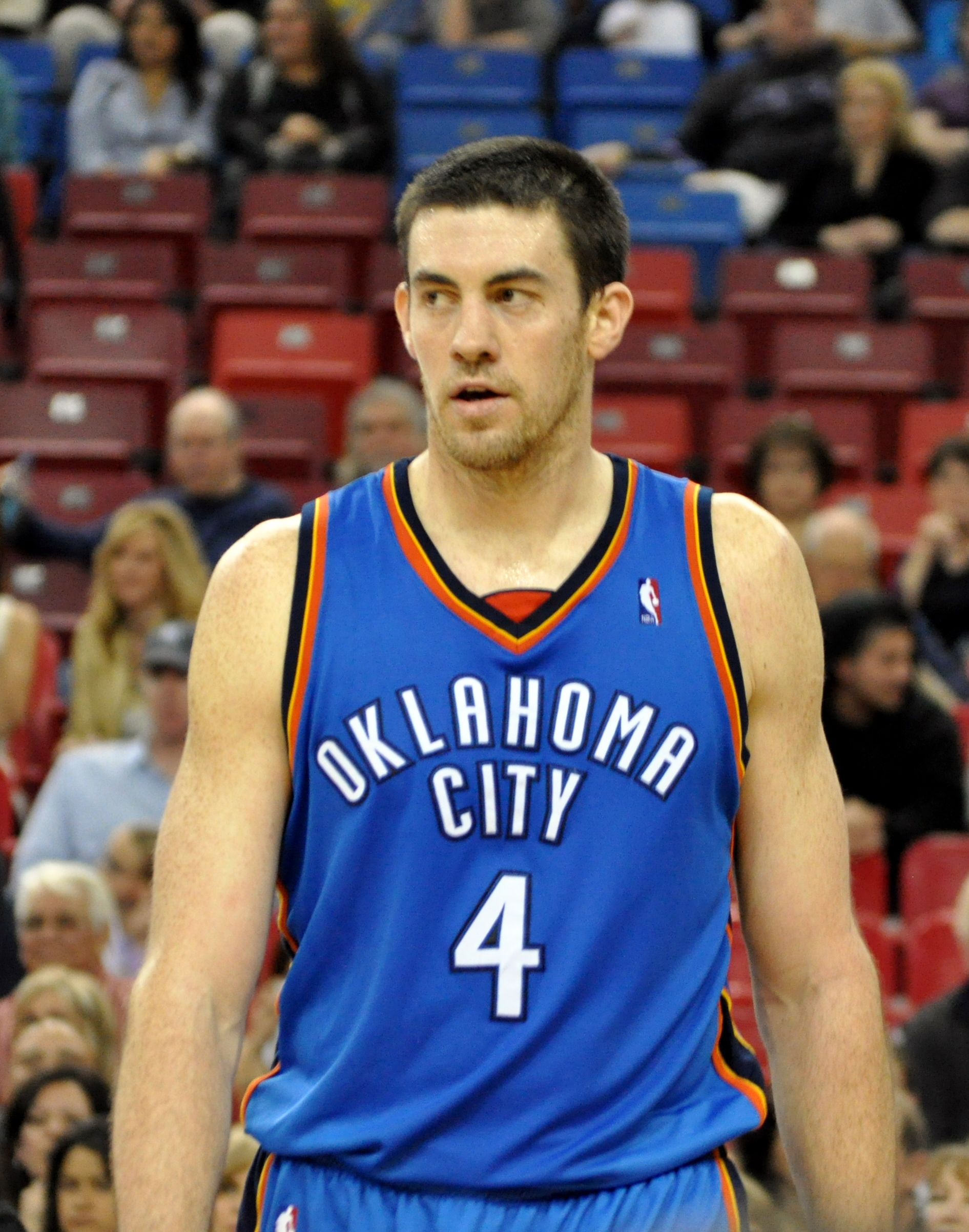
Nick Collison

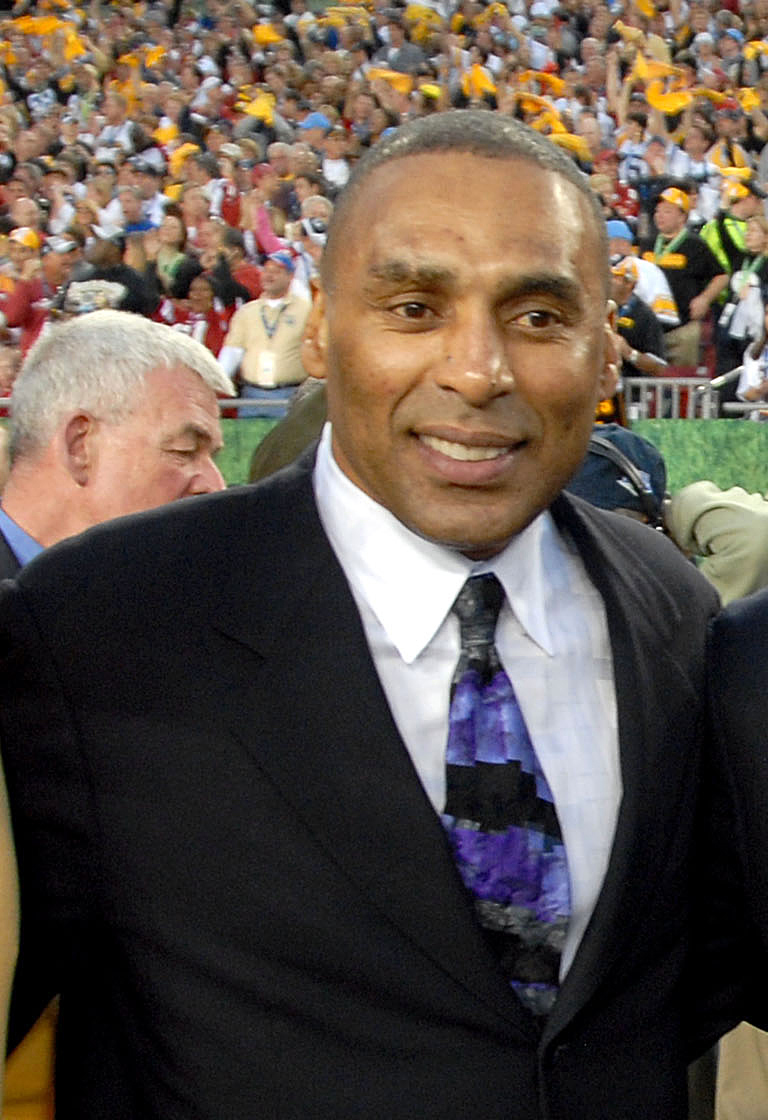
Roger Craig

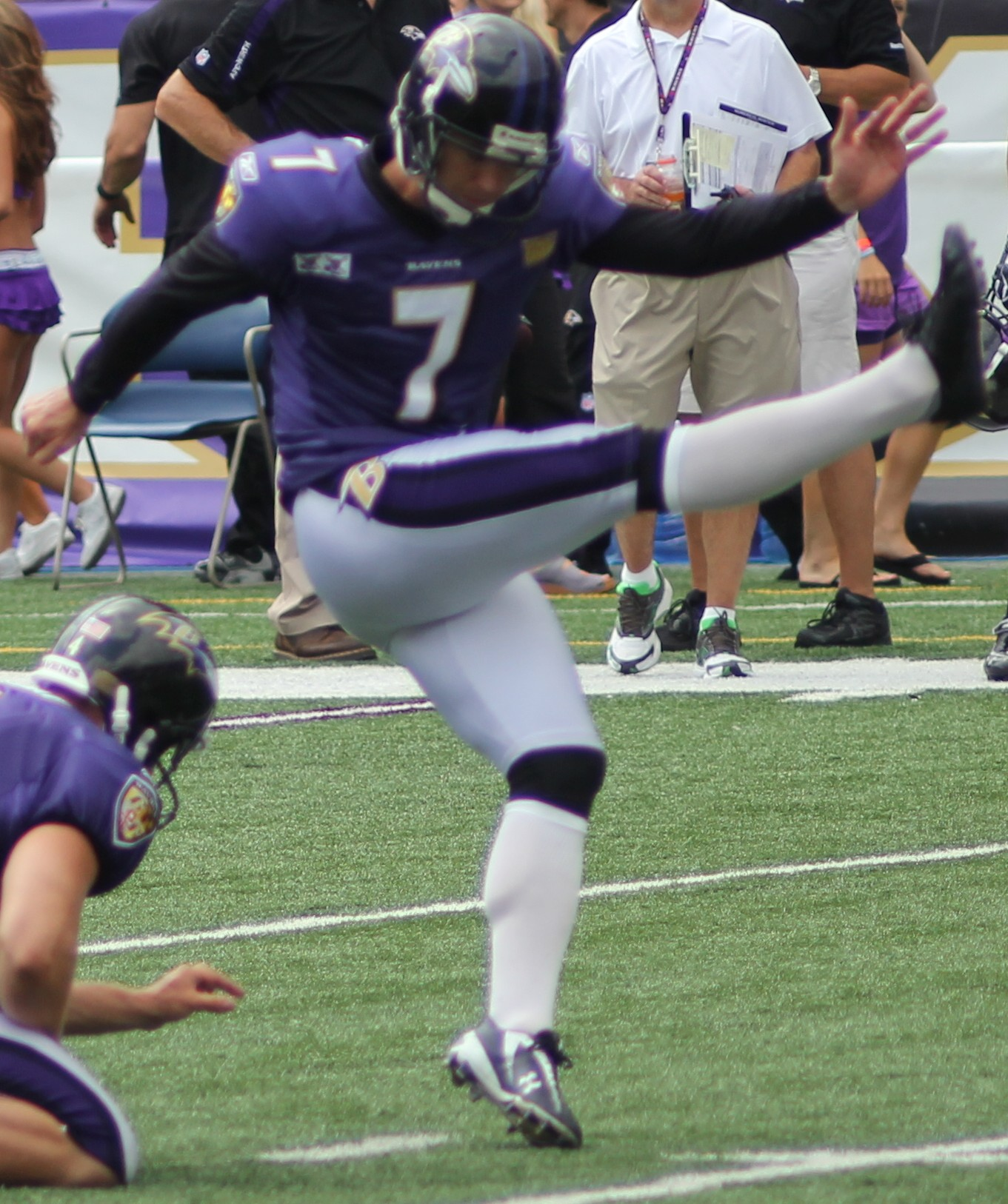
Billy Cundiff

- Samuel Calvin, geologist
- Caitlin Clark
- Marjorie Cameron, actress and occultist
- Branden Campbell, bassist for Neon Trees
- Donald L. Campbell, chemist
- Macdonald Carey, actor
- Chris Carney, politician
- Wallace Carothers, chemist
- Allan Carpenter, author
- Sabin Carr, athlete
- Tommy Carroll, criminal
- Johnny Carson, television talk-show host
- Jordan Carstens, athlete
- Louise Carver, actress
- Thomas Nixon Carver, economics professor
- Frank T. Cary, businessman
- Landon Cassill, auto racer
- Carrie Chapman Catt, suffragette
- Thomas Cech, chemist and Nobel laureate
- Matt Chatham, football player
- The Cherry Sisters, vaudevillians
- Norton P. Chipman, politician, judge
- Tom Churchill, broadcaster
- Bernard A. Clarey, admiral
- Caitlin Clark, WNBA player
- Dallas Clark, § football player
- Laurel Blair Salton Clark, astronaut
- Marvin Clark, man who mysteriously disappeared in 1926
- Rush Clark, politician
- Fred Clarke, baseball Hall of Famer
- Frederick G. Clausen, architect
- Jeff Clement, athlete
- Ron Clements, director and producer
- Scott Clemmensen, athlete
- Buffalo Bill Cody, Wild West showman
- Samuel Cody, aviator
- Harris Coggeshall, athlete
- Danielle Colby, reality-television personality
- King Cole, athlete
- Ada Langworthy Collier, poet, writer
- Chris Collins, hockey player
- Max Allan Collins, mystery writer
- Stephen Collins, actor
- Nick Collison, basketball player
- John W. Colloton, healthcare executive
- Steven Colloton, federal judge
- Anders Colsefni, musician
- Martin Cone, college president
- Edwin H. Conger, diplomat
- Maurice Connolly, politician
- Paul Conrad, political cartoonist
- Ed Conroy, athlete
- George Cram Cook, author
- Marv Cook, football player
- Jack Coombs, athlete
- Eric Cooper, baseball umpire
- Barclay and Edwin Coppock, followers of John Brown
- Frank Cordaro, activist
- Sarah Corpstein, beauty queen
- John M. Corse, Army general
- Ernie Courtney, athlete
- Paul Coverdell, politician
- Thomas Jefferson Cowie, admiral
- Ryan Cownie, stand-up comedian
- Shawn Crahan, musician
- Roger Craig, football player
- Joe Crail, politician
- Coe I. Crawford, politician
- Francis X. Cretzmeyer, coach
- Joel Crisman, football player
- Jim Crotty, athlete
- Julee Cruise, singer and actress
- Frank Cuhel, athlete
- Mariclare Culver, political figure
- Henry J. B. Cummings, politician
- Billy Cundiff, athlete
- Jack Cunningham, screenwriter

== D ==
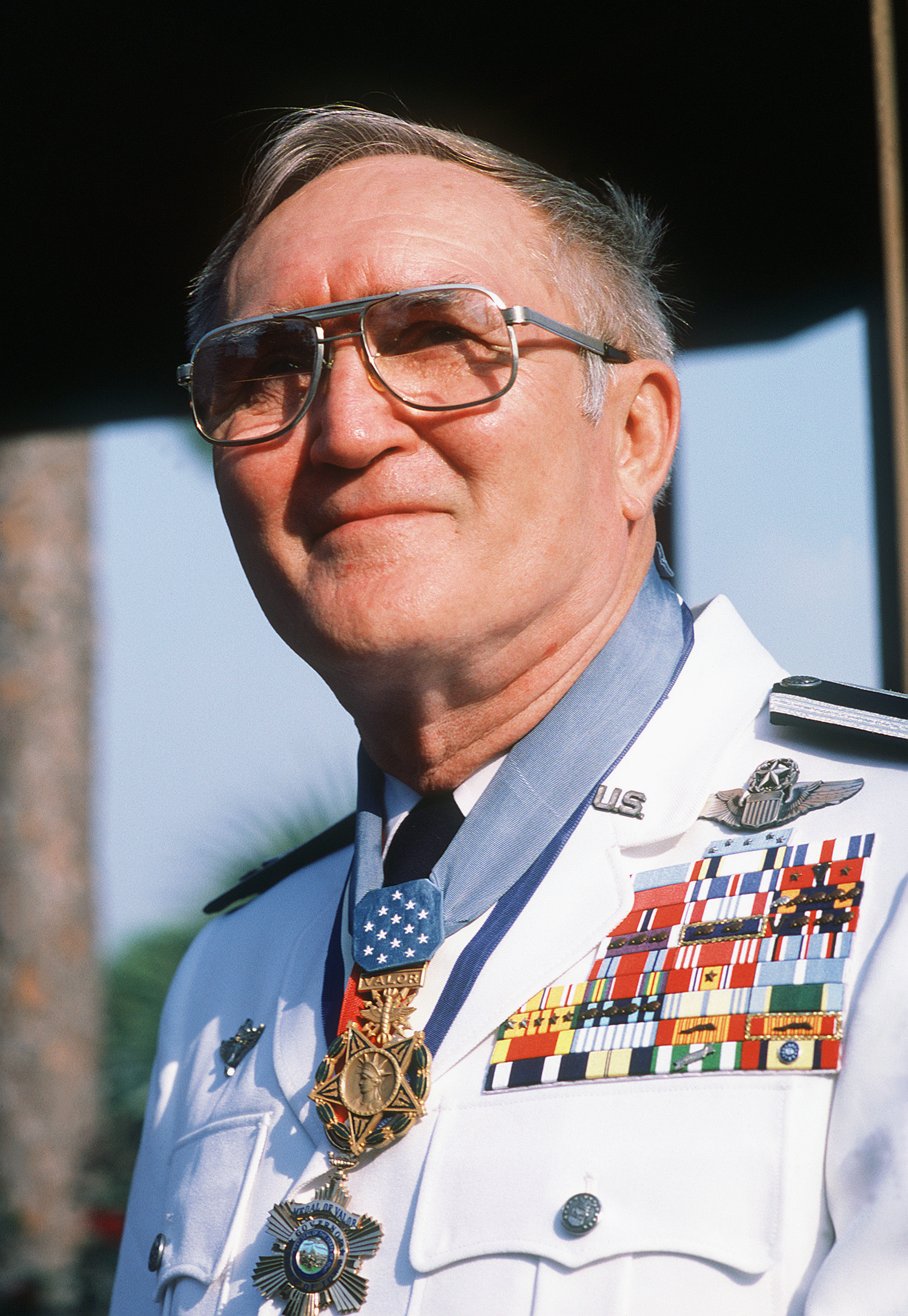
Bud Day

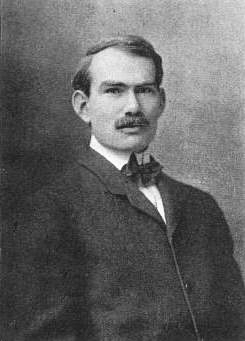
Lee De Forest

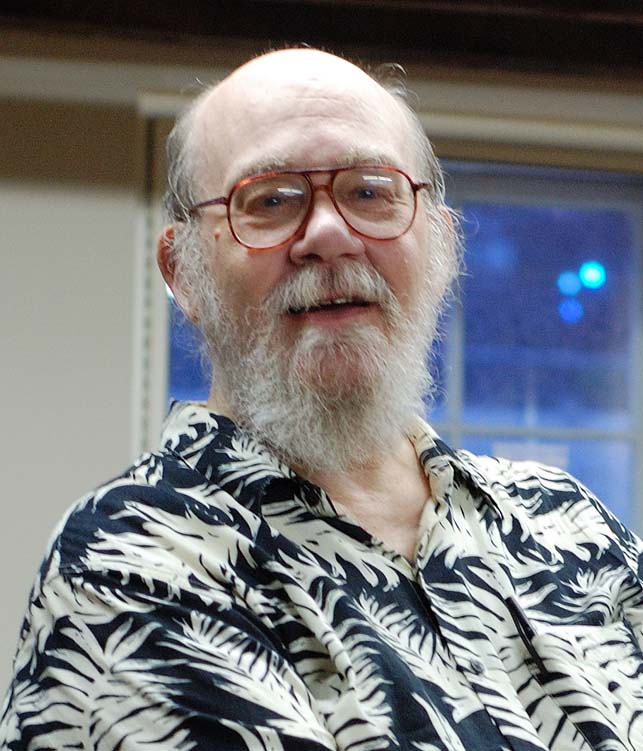
Thomas Disch

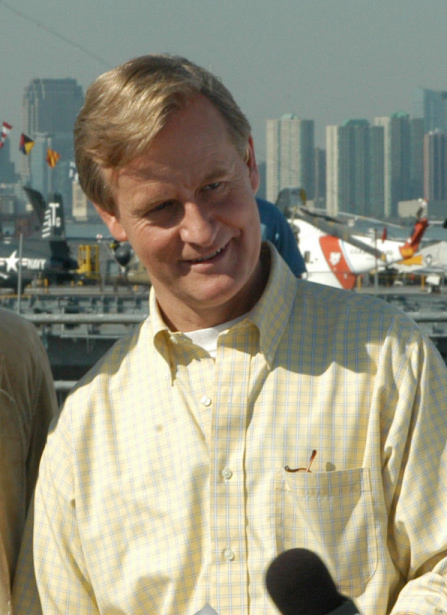
Steve Doocy

- Janet Dailey, author
- Bill Daily, actor
- Dick Dale, musician
- Muriel Frances Dana, actress
- Jack Daniels, politician
- Diane D'Aquila, actress
- Sarah Darling, musician
- Geof Darrow, artist
- Dana Davis, actress
- Barry Davis, Olympic freestyle wrestler
- Rebecca Fjelland Davis, author
- Stuart Davis, musician
- Laura Dawn, activist, singer-songwriter, director/producer
- Bud Day, war hero
- Walter Day, businessman
- Darren Daye, athlete
- Lee De Forest, inventor
- Jordan De Jong, athlete
- Henry Clay Dean, preacher, lawyer
- Don DeFore, actor
- Cooper DeJean, athlete
- W. Edwards Deming, statistician
- Don Denkinger, baseball umpire
- Dave Despain, sports journalist
- Adam Devine, actor
- Aubrey Devine, athlete
- Lester J. Dickinson, politician
- Justin Diercks, auto racer
- Charles Hall Dillon, politician, judge
- Thomas Disch, author
- James Dixon, orchestra conductor
- David M. Dobson, game creator
- Claire Dodd, actress
- Tim Dodd, YouTuber
- Grenville M. Dodge, railroad executive
- Ralph Edward Dodge, religious leader
- Angela Dohrmann, actress
- Ellen Dolan, actress
- Steve Doocy, television journalist
- Russell S. Doughten, filmmaker
- Nicholas Downs, actor
- Joel Dreessen, football player
- Kevin Dresser, collegiate wrestling head coach
- Leanna Field Driftmier, radio personality
- Bobby Driscoll, actor
- Fred Duesenberg, automobile manufacturer
- Randy Duncan, football player
- Francis John Dunn, religious leader
- Lloyd Dunn
- Samuel Grace Dunn, journalist
- Kenneth W. Durant, decorated sailor
- John Durbin, actor
- Tim Dwight, football player

== E ==
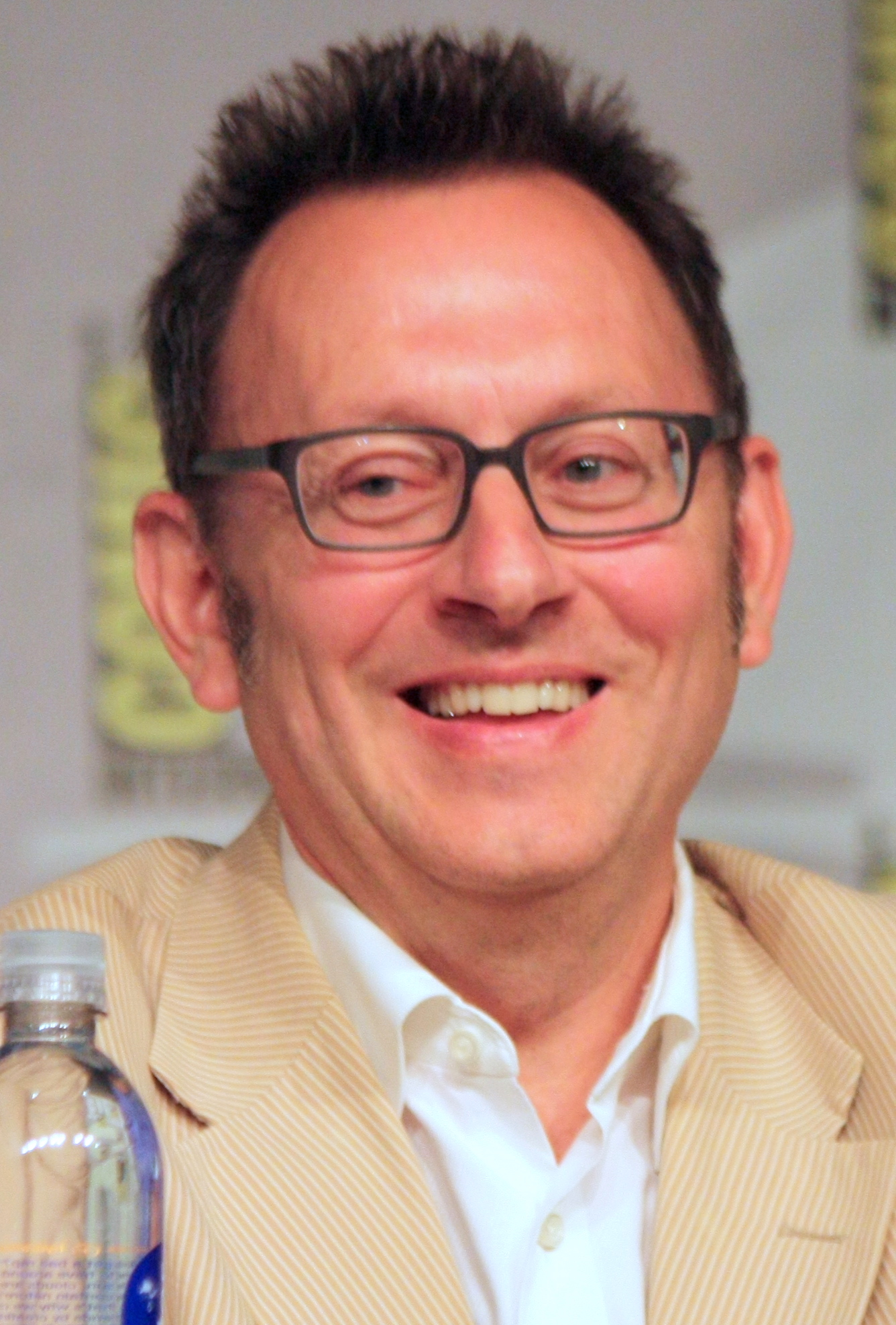
Michael Emerson

Femi Emiola

- Morgan Earp, Wild West lawman
- Warren Earp, brother of Wyatt Earp
- Abastenia St. Leger Eberle, sculptor
- Zales Ecton, politician
- Paul Eells, sportscaster
- Mamie Eisenhower, former First Lady of the United States
- Cal Eldred, athlete
- Jane Elliott, schoolteacher and activist
- James Ellison, actor
- Eugene Burton Ely, aviator
- Paul Emerick, International rugby player, and coach
- Hope Emerson, actress
- Michael Emerson, actor
- Femi Emiola, actress
- Norman A. Erbe, politician
- Joni Ernst, United States senator for Iowa
- Jane Espenson, television producer and writer
- Simon Estes, opera singer
- Linda Evans, political activist
- Frank F. Everest, general
- Barton Warren Evermann, ichthyologist

== F ==
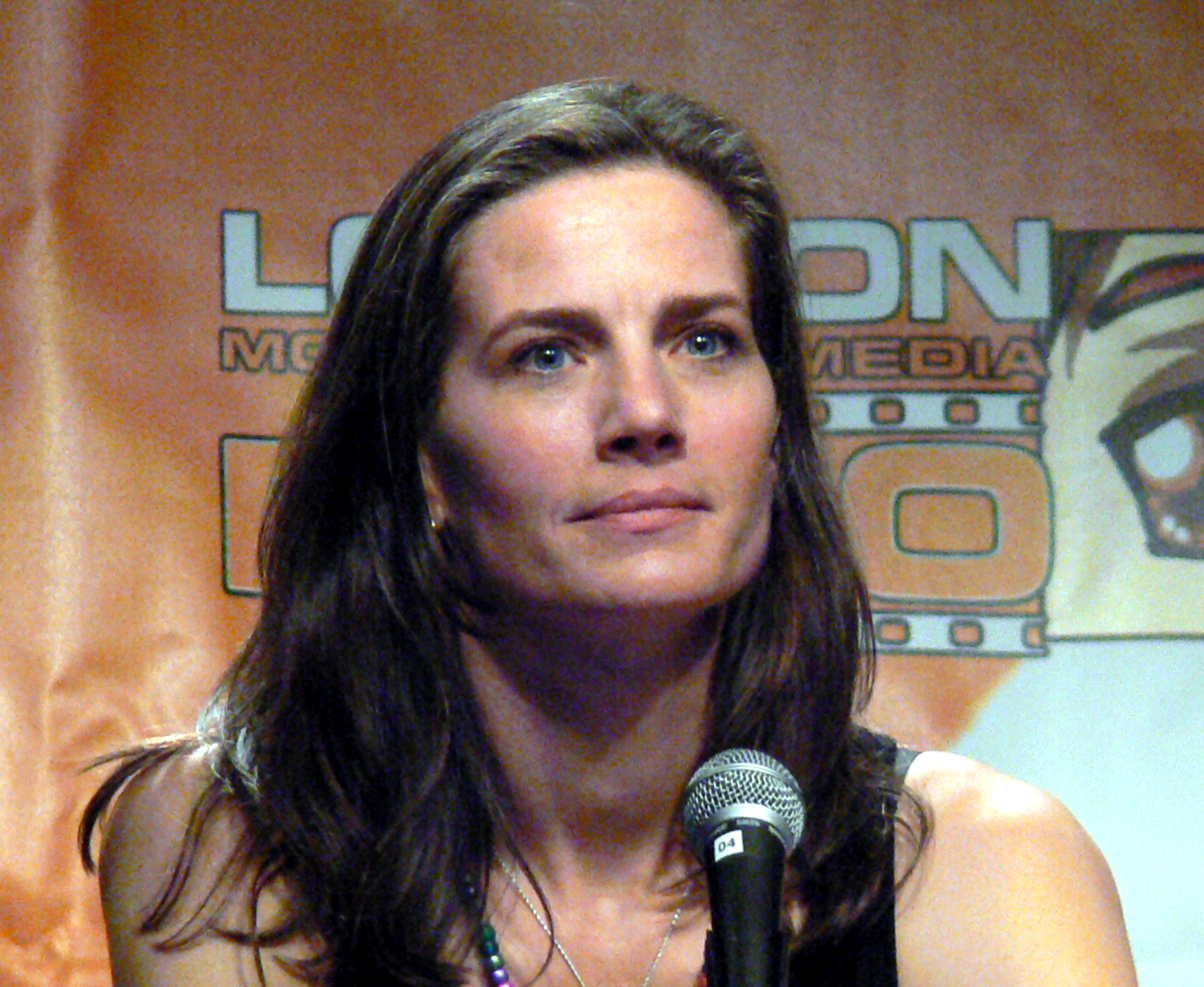
Terry Farrell

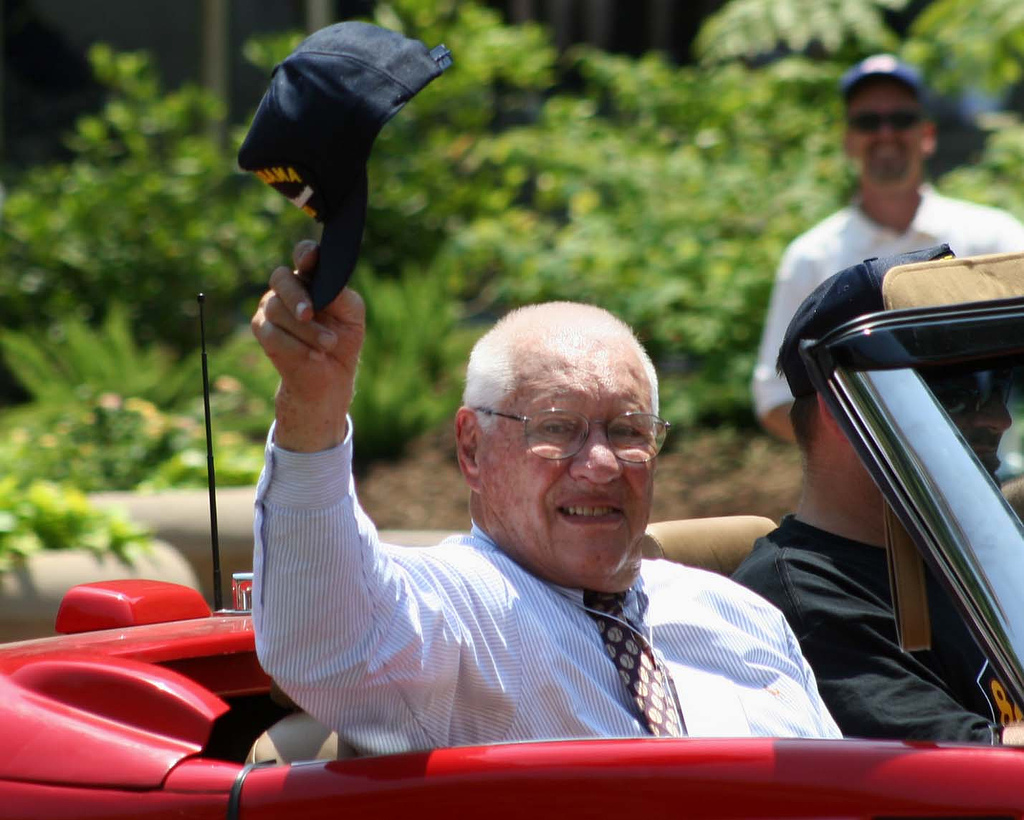
Bob Feller

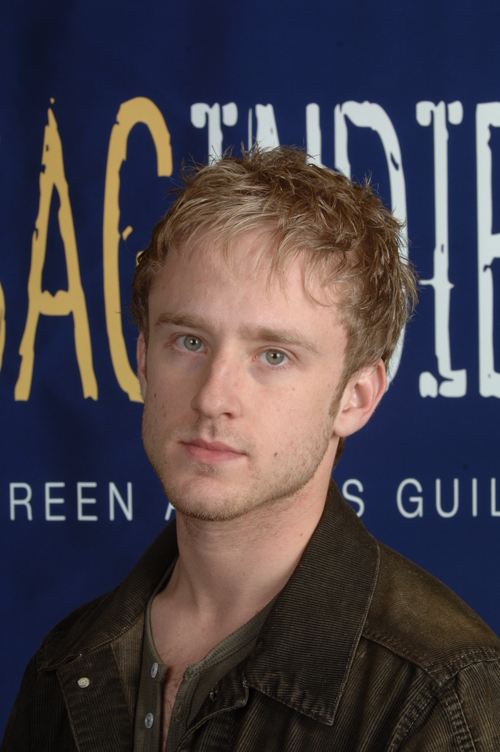
Ben Foster

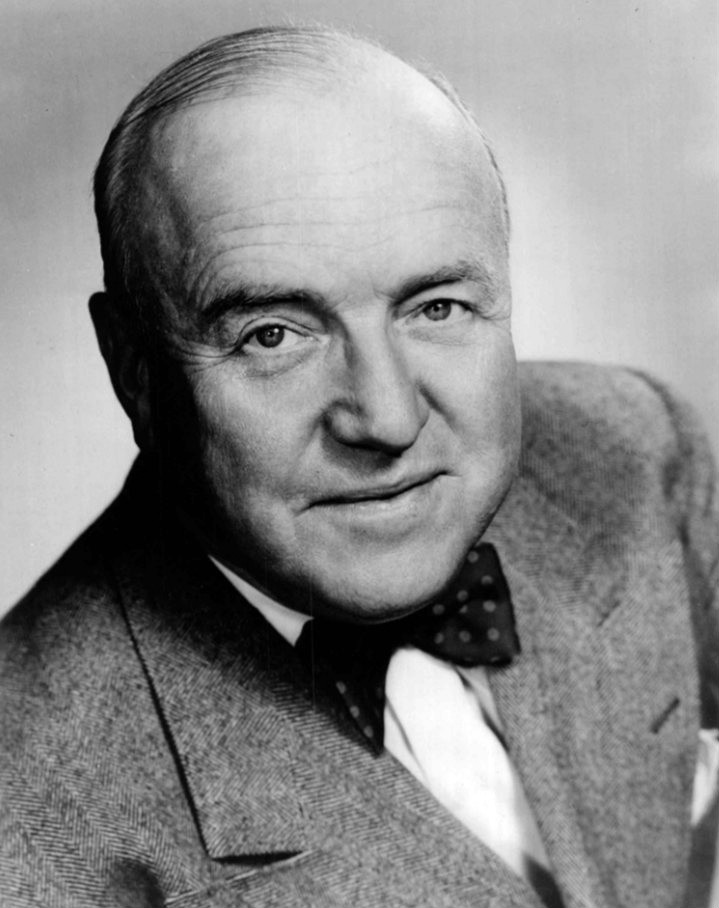
William Frawley

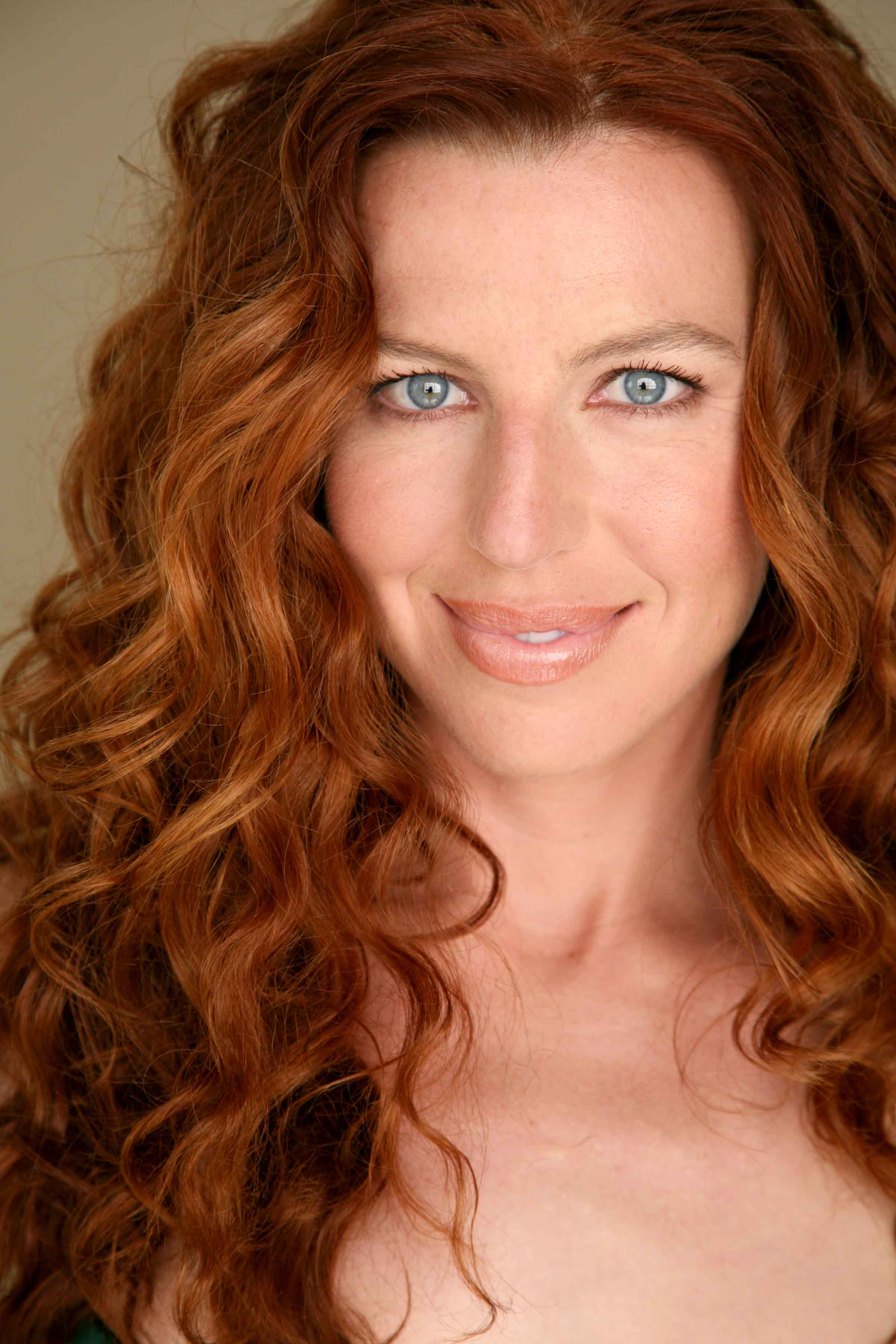
Tanna Frederick

- Randy Florke, writer/publisher of interior design book
- Urban Clarence "Red" Faber, baseball player
- Tom Fadden, actor
- Carole Farley, soprano singer
- Art Farmer, jazz musician
- Sharon Farrell, actress
- Terry Farrell, actress
- James Fee, photographer
- Victor Feguer, convicted murderer
- Chris Fehn, musician
- Margaret Feldner, university president
- Bob Feller, baseball player
- Mary Fels, philanthropist, suffragist, Georgist
- James Ferentz, football player
- Jeremy Ferguson, musician
- Susan Frances Nelson Ferree, journalist, activist, suffragist
- Susan Fessenden, activist, social reformer
- Al Feuerbach, track and field athlete
- Romaine Fielding, actor
- Margarita Fischer, actress
- Matt Fish, basketball player
- Freddie Fisher, musician
- Bill Fitch, basketball coach
- Joseph Fitz, naval veteran
- Bridget Flanery, actress
- John Flannagan, priest
- Jack Fleck, golfer
- Frank Jack Fletcher, admiral
- Robert Fletcher, costume designer
- Rich Folkers, baseball player
- Bradbury Foote, screenwriter
- Ben Foster, actor
- Jon Foster, musician
- Judith Ellen Foster, lawyer
- Farrah Franklin, singer
- William Frawley, actor
- John T. Frederick, scholar
- Tanna Frederick, actress
- Joan Freeman, actress
- Bruce French, actor
- George B. French, actor
- Joe Frisco, vaudeville performer
- Virgil Frye, actor, boxer

== G ==
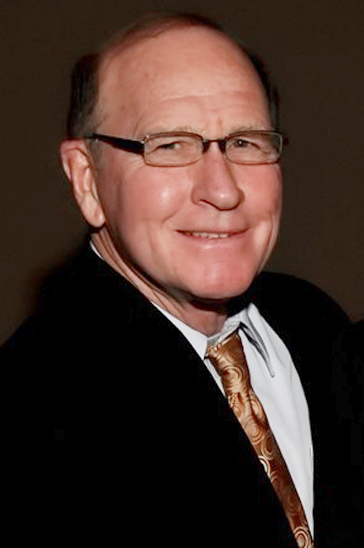
Dan Gable

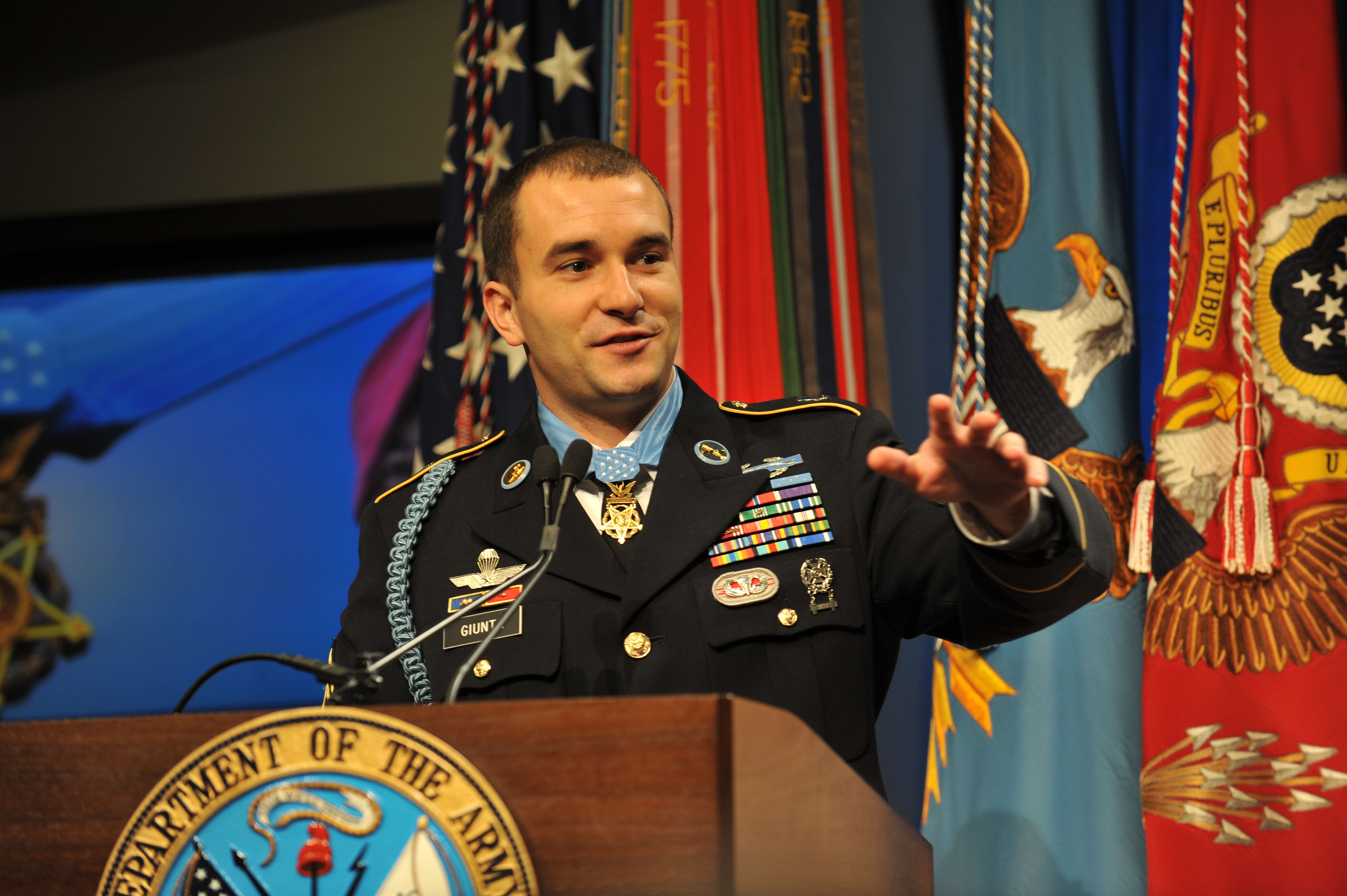
Salvatore Giunta

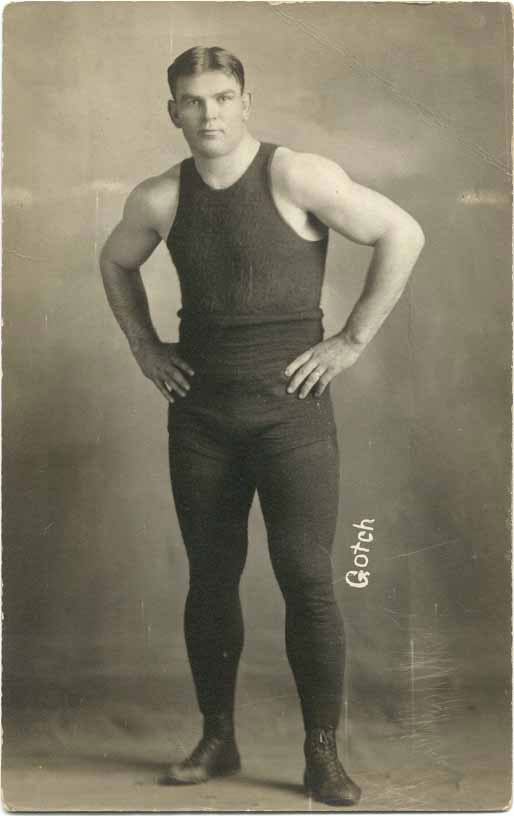
Frank Gotch

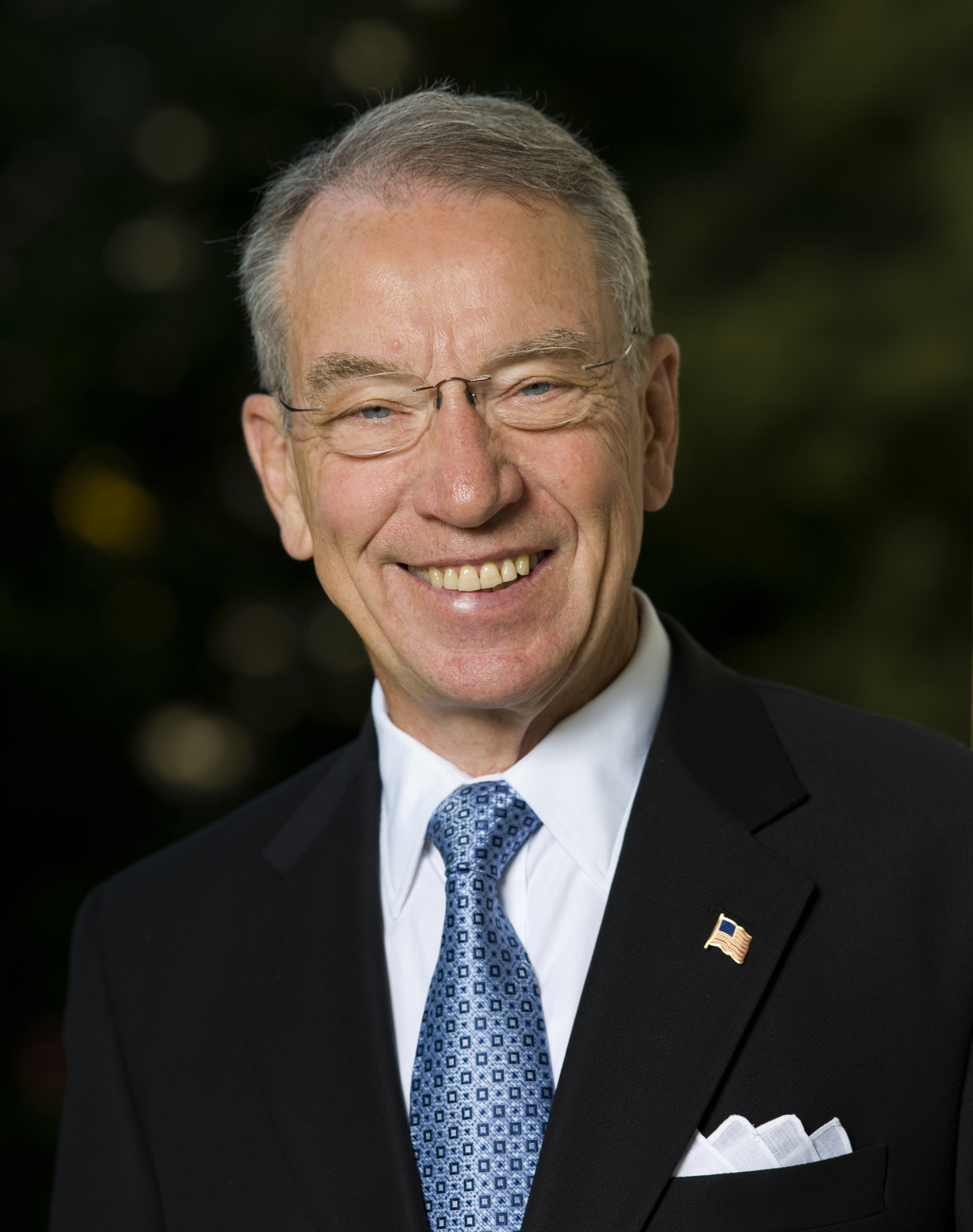
Chuck Grassley

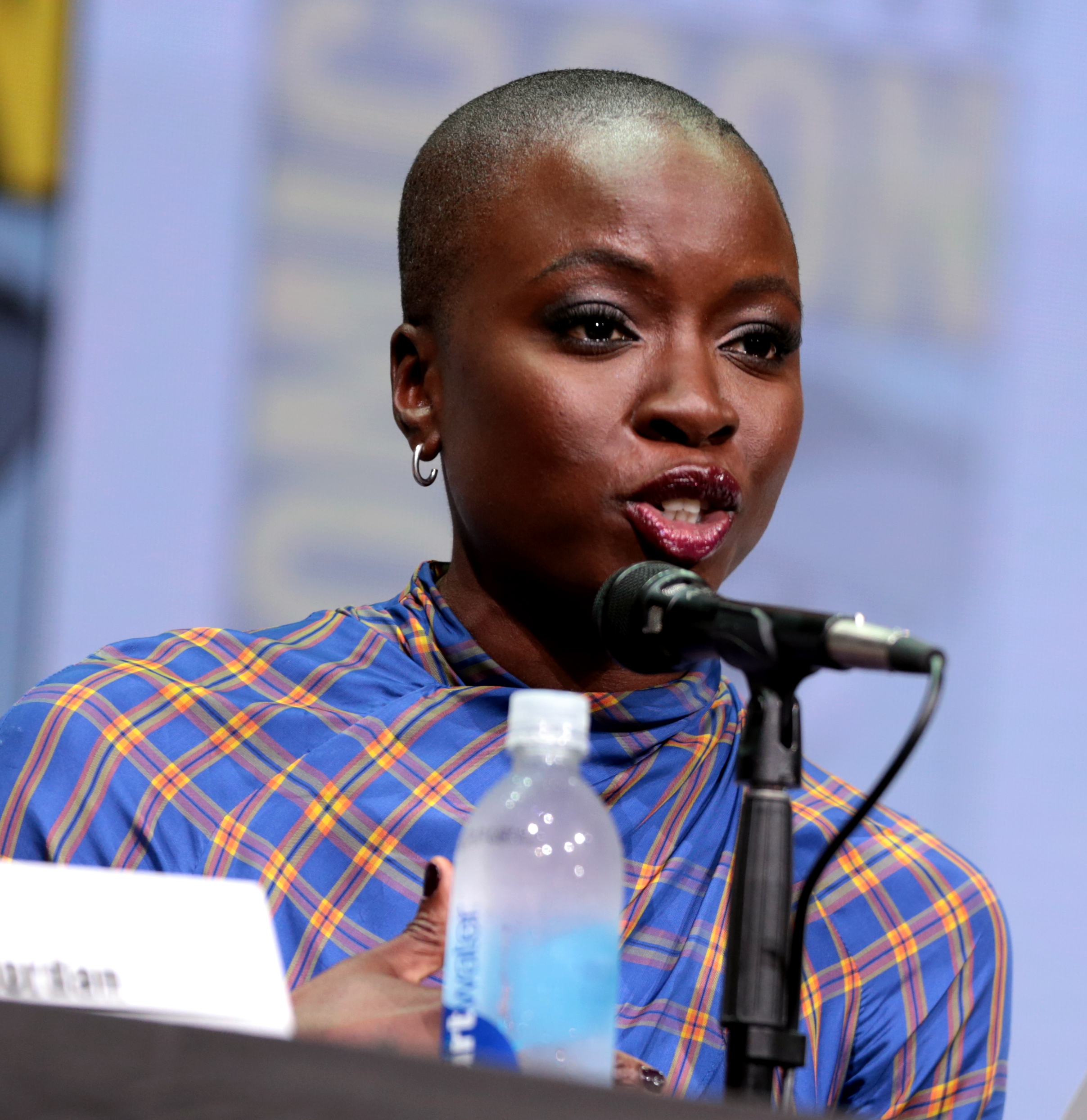
Danai Gurira

- Dan Gable, Olympic freestyle wrestler, wrestling coach
- Jetseta Gage, kidnap victim
- Robert Gallery, football player
- George Horace Gallup, founder of Gallup Poll
- Viola Garfield, anthropologist
- Jim Garrison, lawyer, judge
- David Garst, farmer, seed manufacturer
- Roswell Garst, farmer, seed manufacturer
- Michael Gartner, journalist
- Joey Gase, NASCAR driver
- Harry Gaspar, baseball player
- James Lorraine Geddes, soldier
- John Getz, actor
- Dick Gibbs, basketball player
- Edward H. Gillette, politician
- Thomas Gilman, Olympic freestyle wrestler
- Owen Gingerich, astronomer
- Annabeth Gish, actress
- Salvatore Giunta, Congressional Medal of Honor recipient
- Fred Glade, baseball player
- Susan Glaspell, playwright
- Dan Goldie, tennis player
- Johnny Gosch, kidnap victim
- Frank Gotch, professional wrestler
- Al Gould, baseball player
- Rick Graf, football player
- Fred Grandy, actor, politician
- Chuck Grassley, Iowa senator
- Paul Gray, musician
- Dick Green, baseball player
- George Greene, Supreme Court justice
- Edna Griffin, civil rights activist
- James W. Grimes, Iowa governor and senator
- Dan Grimm, football player
- Harold R. Gross, politician
- Danai Gurira, actress
- Janet Guthrie, auto racer

== H ==
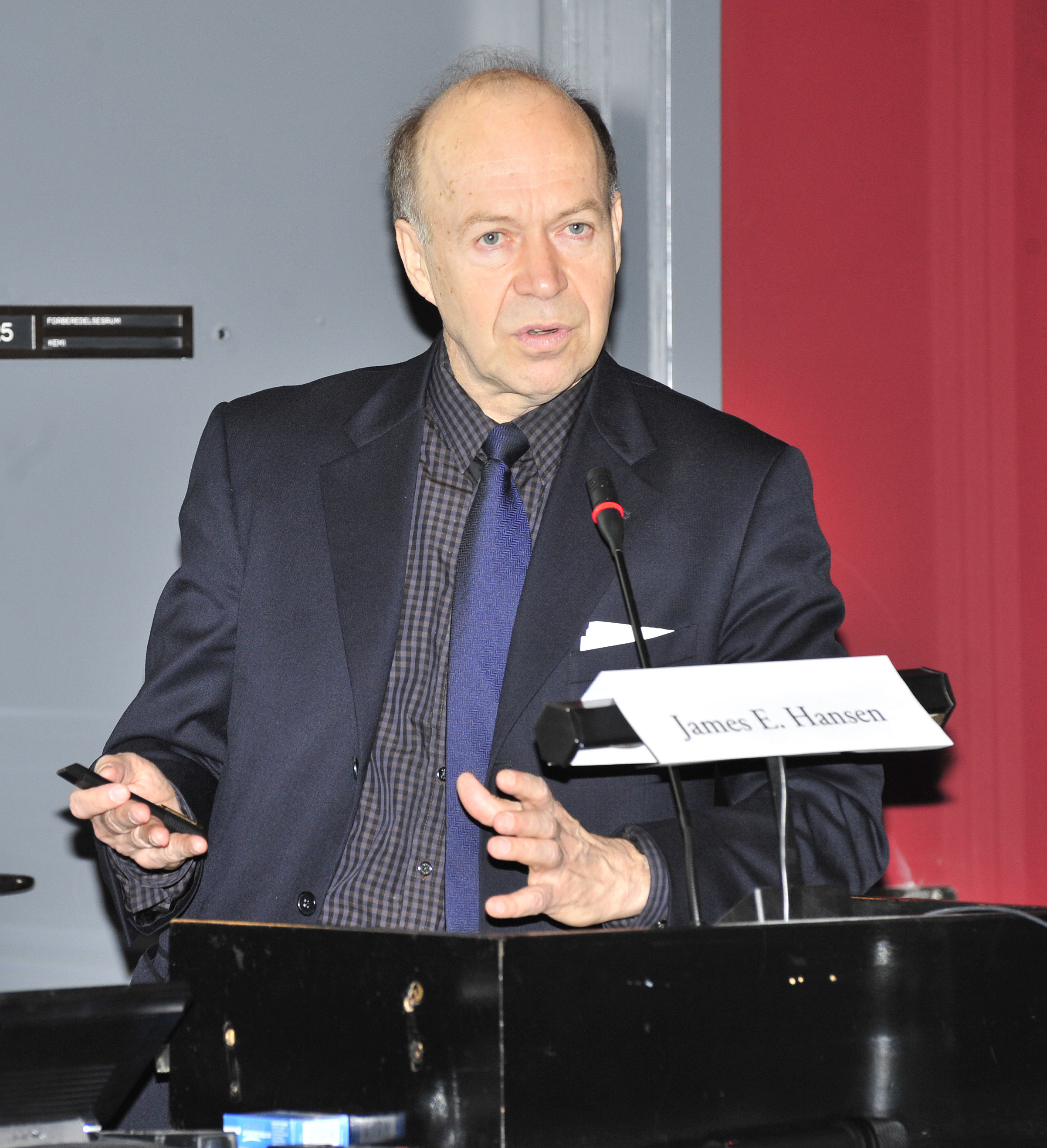
James Hansen

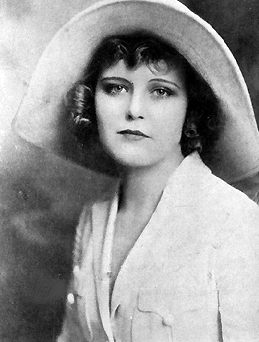
Juanita Hansen

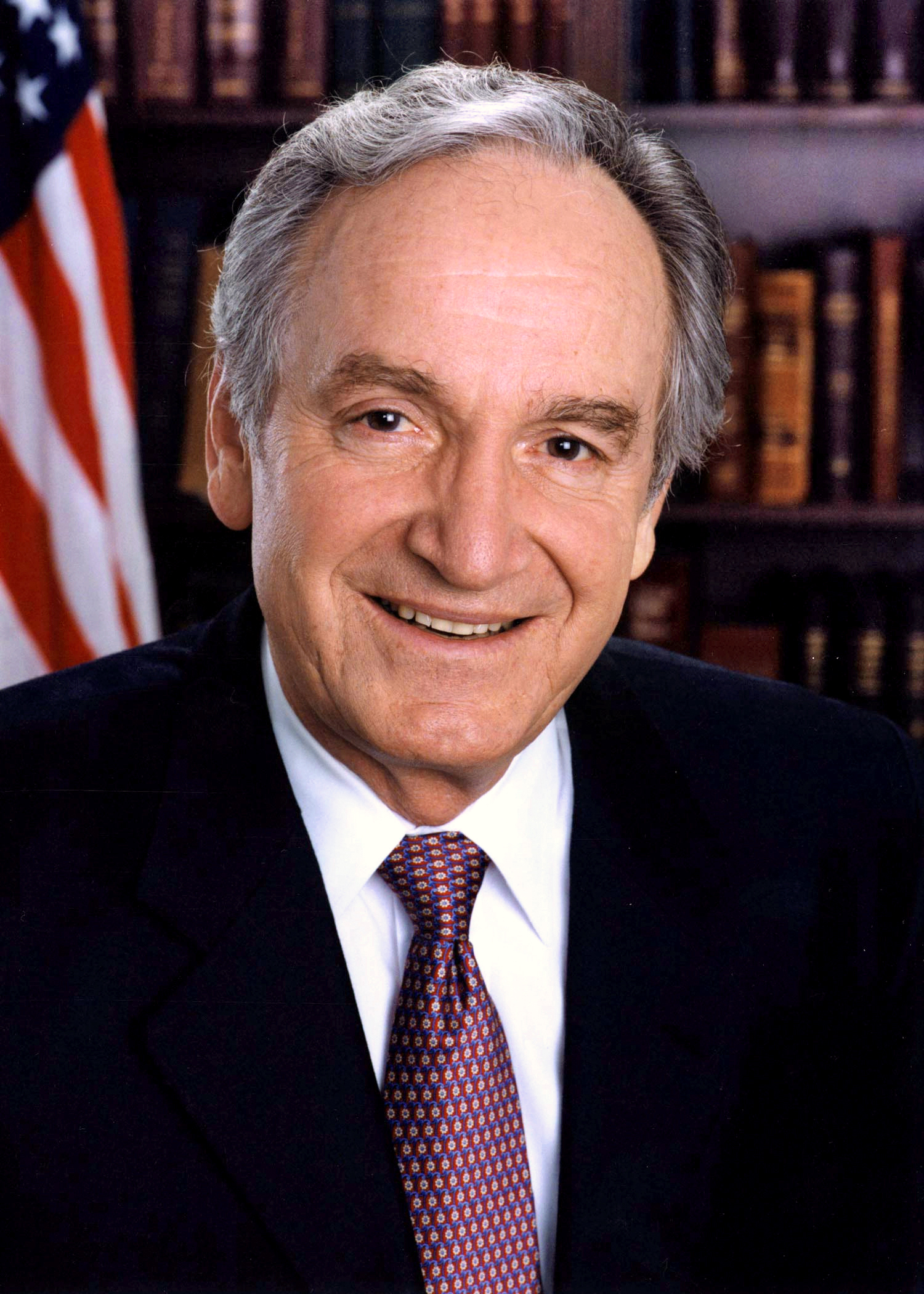
Tom Harkin

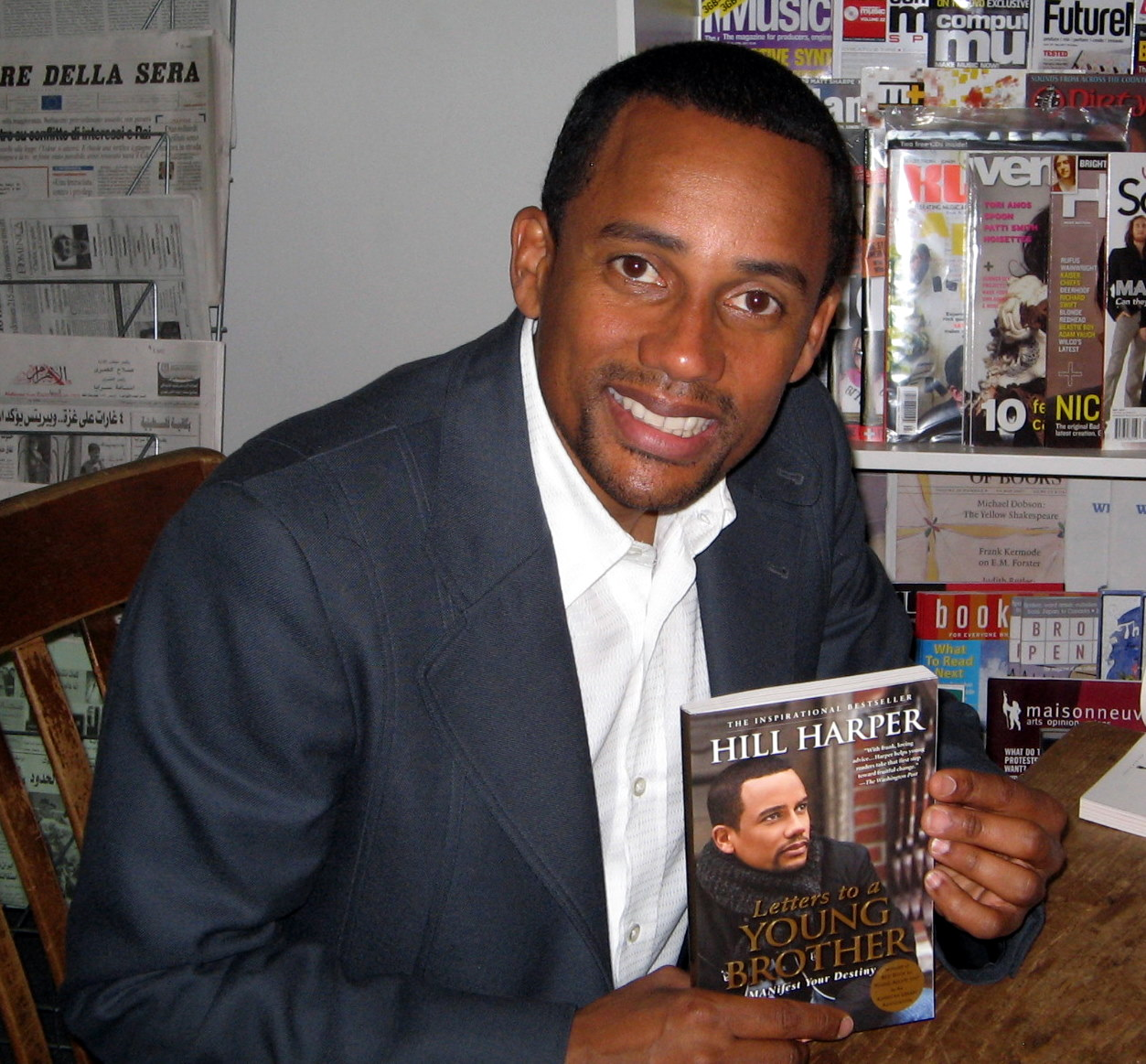
Hill Harper

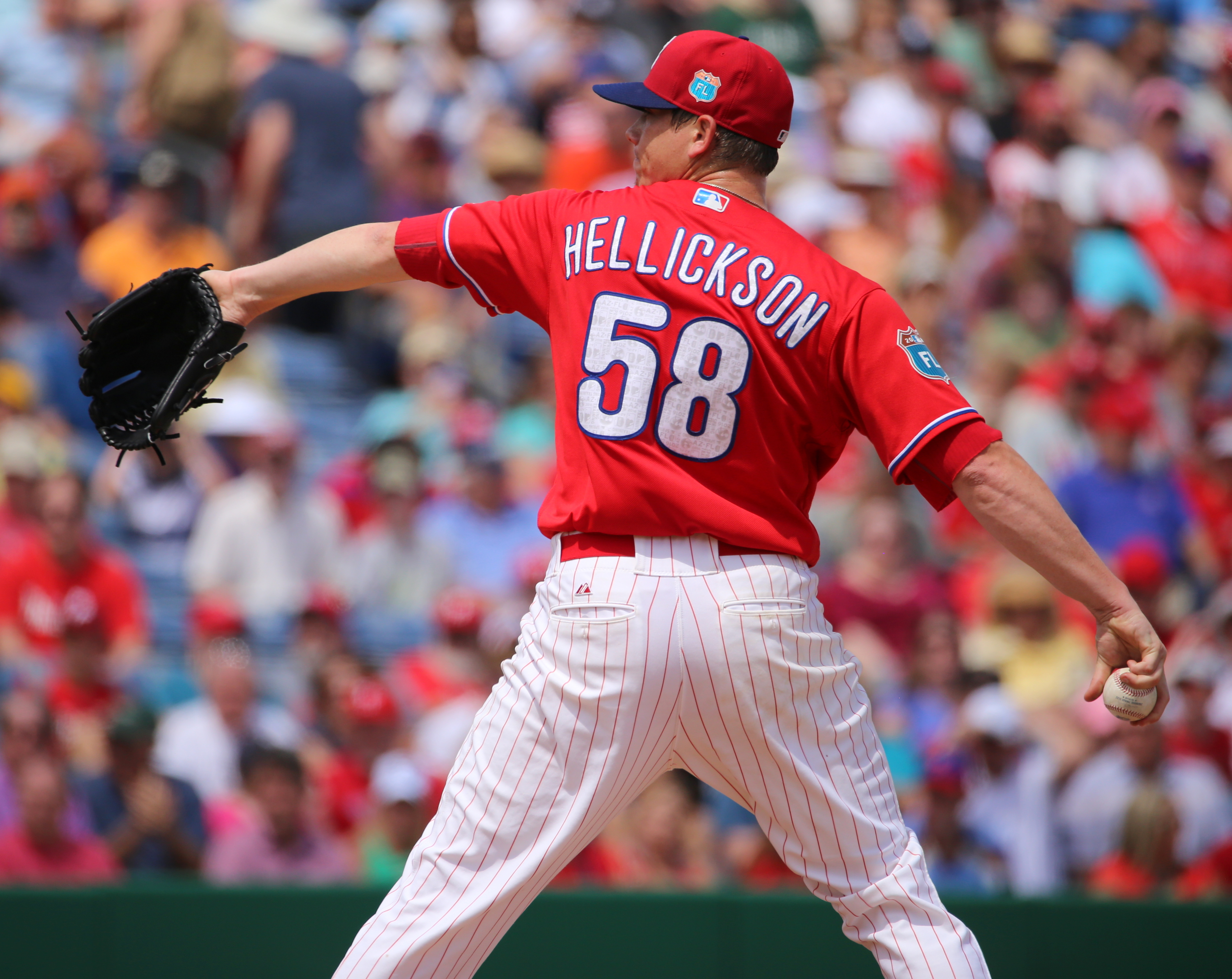
Jeremy Hellickson

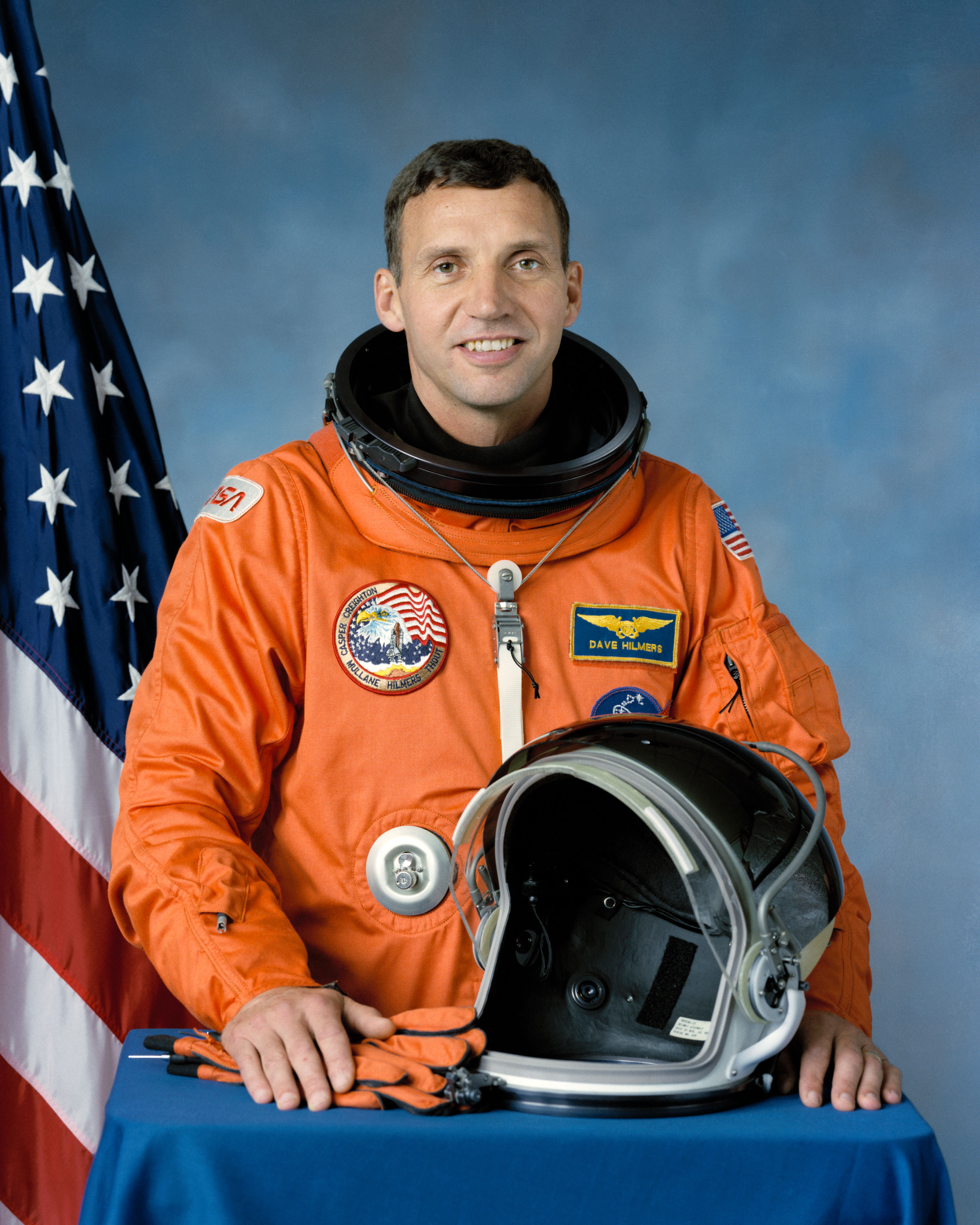
David C. Hilmers

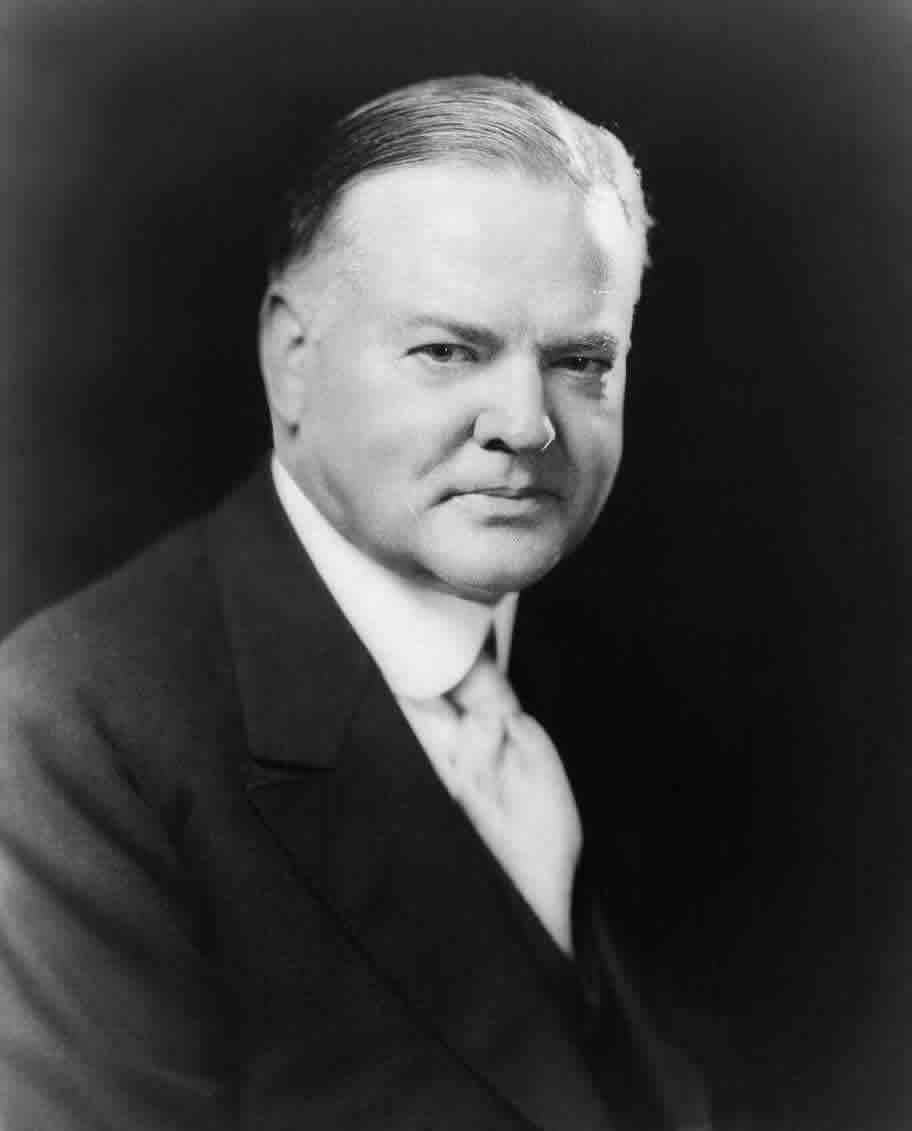
Herbert Hoover

- Charlie Haden, musician
- Mike Haight, football player
- Don Hall, film director
- Leslie Hall, rapper
- Jack Halloran, composer
- Scot Halpin, musician
- Halston (Roy Halston Frowick), fashion designer
- Adam Haluska, basketball player
- Andy Haman, professional bodybuilder
- Jack Hamilton, baseball player
- Milo Hamilton, baseball broadcaster
- Edward Hammatt, architect
- Ryan Hannam, football player
- Joel Hanrahan, baseball player
- Bob Hansen, basketball player
- James Hansen, professor
- Juanita Hansen, actress
- Niels Ebbesen Hansen, botanist
- Robert Hansen, convicted murderer
- William L. Harding, 22nd governor of Iowa (1917–1921)
- Tom Harkin, U.S. senator from Iowa (1985–2015)
- Bob Harlan, professional football executive
- James Harlan, politician
- Graham Harman, professor
- Kate Stevens Harpel, teacher, physician
- Hill Harper, actor
- Frank Hatton, politician
- Tim Hauff, jazz musician
- Eva Lund Haugen, author
- James H. Hawley, 9th governor of Idaho (1911–1913)
- Merle Hay, World War I soldier
- Frank Hayes, unionist
- Peter Hedges, writer
- Alan J. Heeger, Nobel Prize in Chemistry laureate (2000)
- Jeremy Hellickson, baseball player
- Stephen P. Hempstead, 2nd governor of Iowa (1850–1854)
- John Hench, associate of Walt Disney
- David B. Henderson, 34th speaker of the U.S. House of Representatives (1899–1903)
- Dorothy Hennessey, nun, activist
- Gwen Hennessey, nun, activist
- John Hennessy, religious leader
- Chad Hennings, football player
- William Peters Hepburn, American Civil War officer, politician
- Francis J. Herron, American Civil War general
- Daniel Hess, inventor
- Phil Hester, comic-book artist
- James C. Hickman, actuary
- David Anthony Higgins, actor
- Steve Higgins, writer, comedian, actor, and announcer on The Tonight Show Starring Jimmy Fallon
- Harriet Hilliard, actress
- David C. Hilmers, astronaut
- A. J. Hinch, baseball player, manager
- Kirk Hinrich, basketball player
- Herbert E. Hitchcock, U.S. senator from South Dakota (1936–1938)
- J. B. E. Hittle, decorated intelligence officer, historian
- Tami Hoag, novelist
- Terry Hoage, football player
- Thomas M. Hoenig, financier
- Mari Ruef Hofer (1858/59–1929), composer, lecturer, teacher, writer
- Bill Hoffer, baseball player
- Fred Hoiberg, basketball player, coach
- Judd Holdren, actor
- Ducky Holmes, baseball player
- Lizzie Holmes, educator, anarchist
- Elmer G. Homrighausen, theologian
- Herbert Hoover, 31st president of the United States (1929–1933)
- Lou Henry Hoover, First Lady of the United States (1929–1933)
- Harry Hopkins, 8th U.S. secretary of commerce (1938–1940)
- Frank O. Horton, politician
- Austin Howard, football player
- Walter Howey, journalist
- Jerome Clarke Hunsaker, zeppelin authority
- Mary Beth Hurt, actress
- Toby Huss, actor
- Dick Hutcherson, stock-car racer
- Libbie Hyman, zoologist

== I ==
- Jim Inhofe, politician
- Inkpaduta, Native American chief
- Arnold J. Isbell, aviator

== J ==
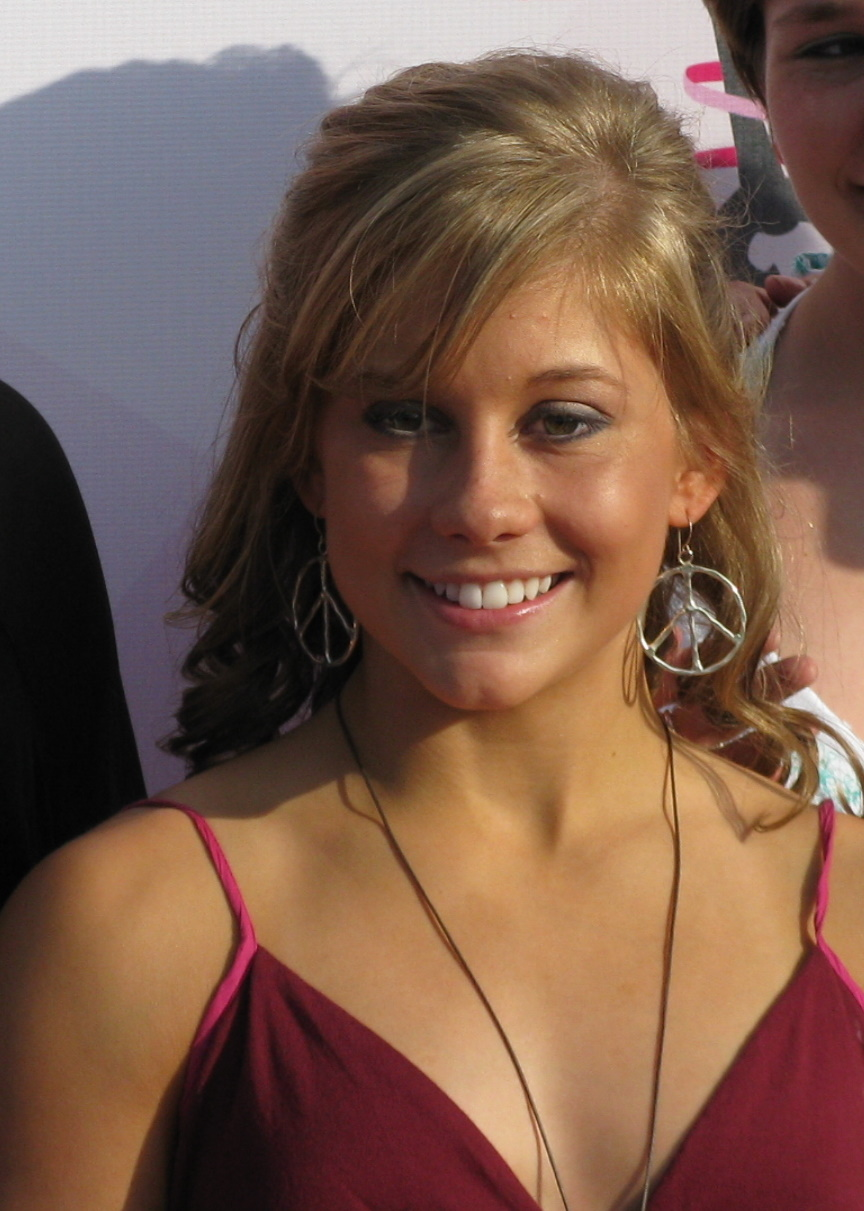
Shawn Johnson

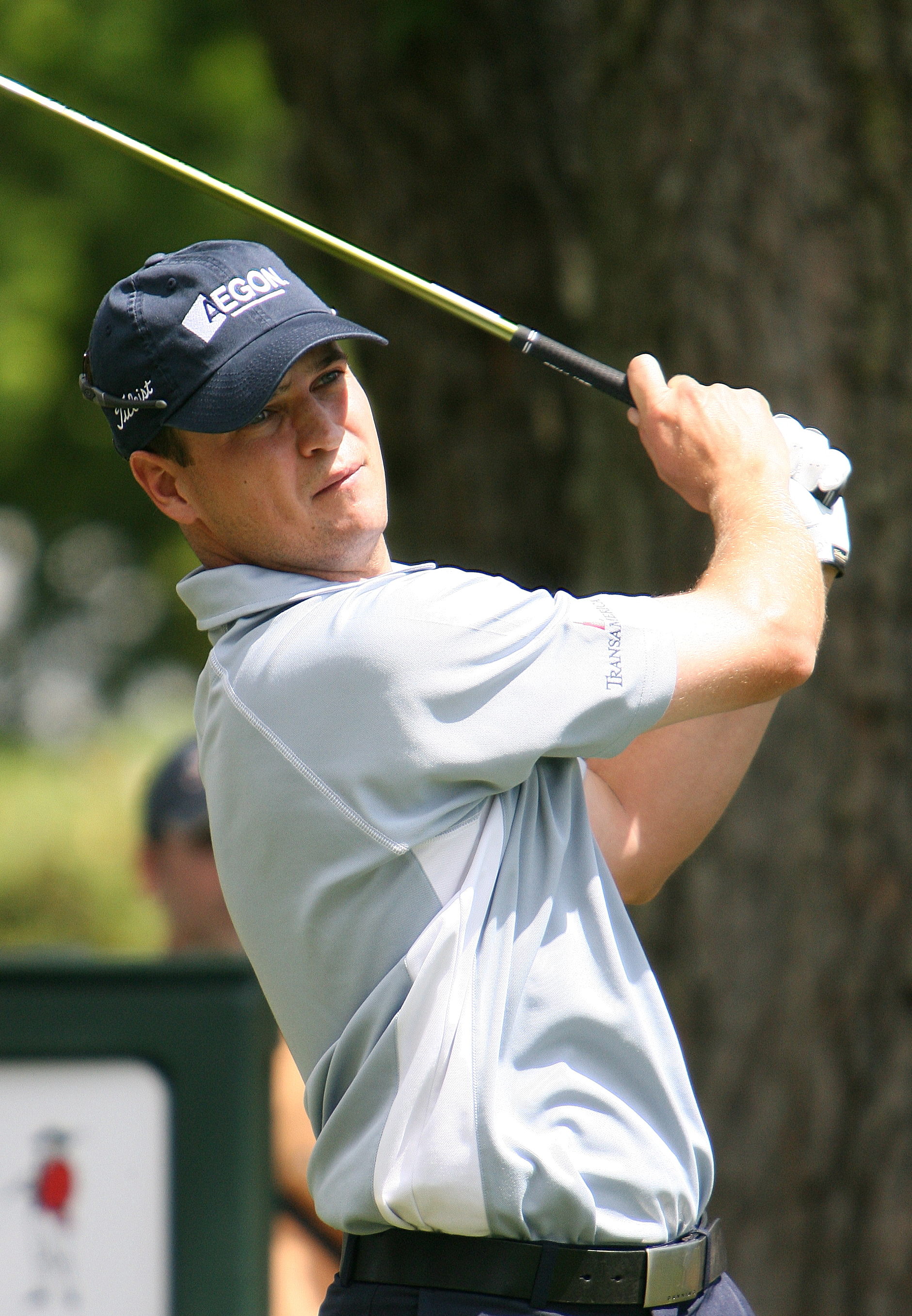
Zach Johnson

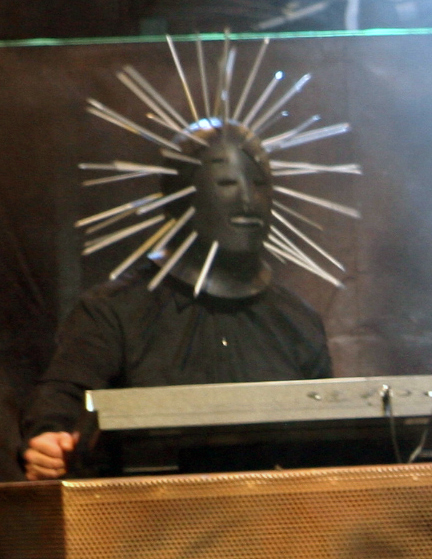
Craig Jones

- Jacob Jaacks, basketball player
- Fred Jackman, cinematographer
- Selmer Jackson, actor
- Kip Janvrin, athlete
- N. K. Jemisin, science fiction/fantasy author
- Frank Jenks, actor
- Dan Jennings, baseball player
- Roger Jepsen, politician
- Jake Johannsen, comedian
- Donald Johanos, symphony conductor
- Bryce Johnson, actor
- Dorothy M. Johnson, author
- Edwin S. Johnson, politician
- Georgann Johnson, actress
- Lulu Johnson, historian
- Nicholas Johnson, FCC commissioner
- Royal C. Johnson, politician
- Shawn Johnson, gymnast
- Zach Johnson, golfer
- Peter Jok, § basketball player
- Craig Jones, musician
- George Wallace Jones
- Gordon Jones, actor
- James Jones, football player
- Lolo Jones, athlete
- Kathryn Joosten, actress
- Joey Jordison, musician
- Duane Josephson, baseball player
- Patty Judge, politician
- Jerry Junkins, CEO of Texas Instruments

== K ==
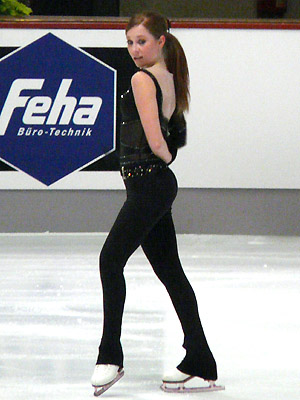
Danielle Kahle

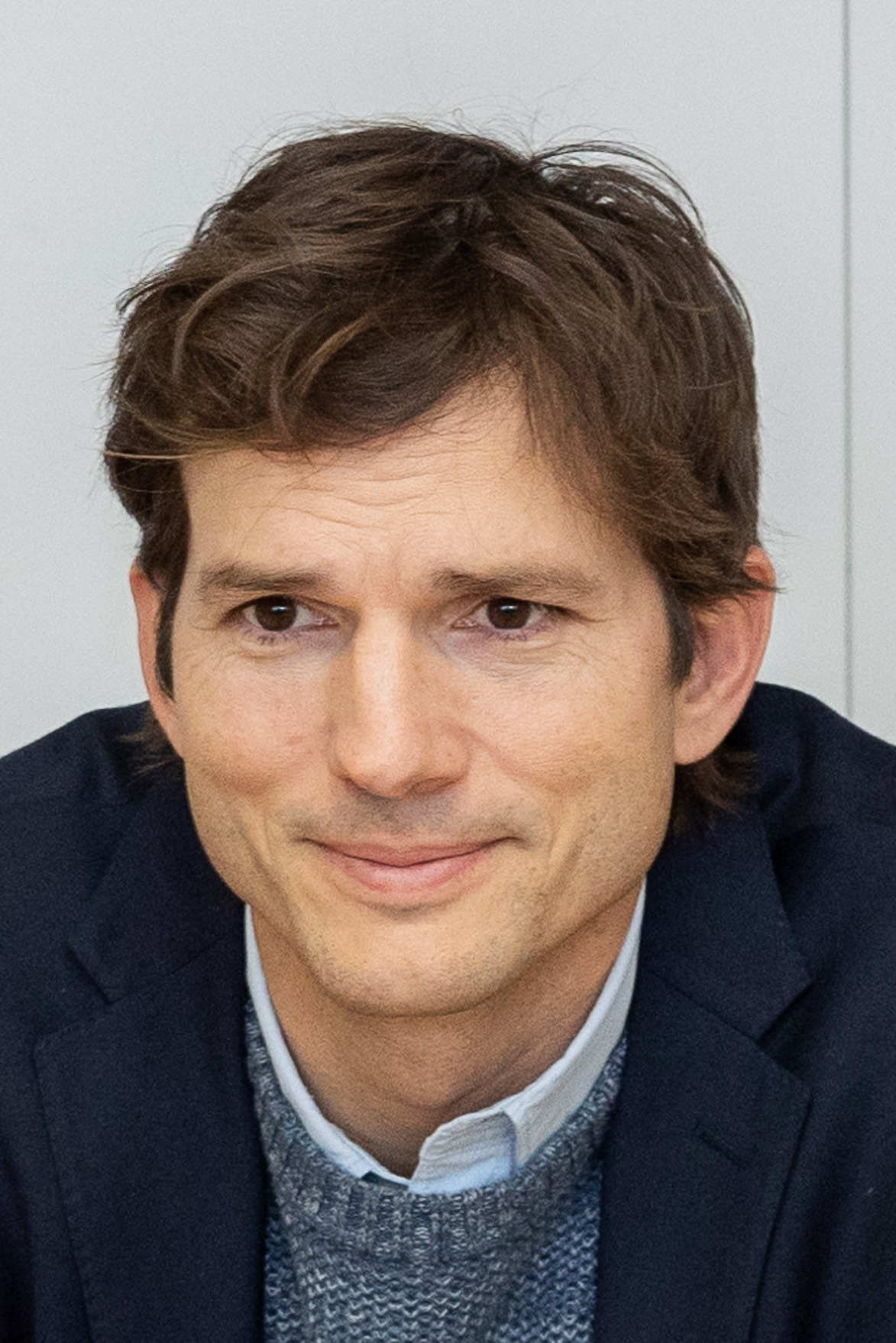
Ashton Kutcher

- Nate Kaeding, football placekicker
- Danielle Kahle, figure skater
- Jacqui Kalin (born 1989), American-Israeli professional basketball player
- Aaron Kampman, football player
- MacKinlay Kantor, journalist, author
- Gail Karp, cantor
- Bradley Kasal, decorated U.S. Marine
- John A. Kasson, politician
- Hazel Keener, actress
- James M. Kelly, astronaut
- Percy R. Kelly, judge
- Keokuk, Sauk chief
- John H. Kemble, professor
- Charles Reuben Keyes, archaeologist
- Charles Rollin Keyes, geologist
- Hugh Kidder, decorated U.S. Marine
- Kerry Killinger, banker
- Angela Jia Kim, classical pianist
- Mitch King, football player
- Rebecca Ann King, 1974 Miss America
- Steve King, politician
- Dallas Kinney, journalist
- Nile Kinnick, football player
- James T. Kirk, fictional character
- Samuel J. Kirkwood, § governor, senator, U.S. secretary of the interior
- Philip J. Klass, UFO researcher
- Stephen Kline, artist
- Bradford Knapp, university president
- Corina Knoll, journalist
- Ruth Kobart, performer
- Matt Koch, baseball player
- Bonnie Koloc, singer
- Jon Koncak, basketball player
- Ted Kooser, poet
- Dan Koppen, football player
- Kyle Korver, basketball player
- Joseph Kosinski, commercial director
- Mitch Krebs, television journalist
- Gary Kroeger, actor
- Josh Kroeger, baseball player
- Matt Kroul, football player
- Ashton Kutcher, actor

== L ==
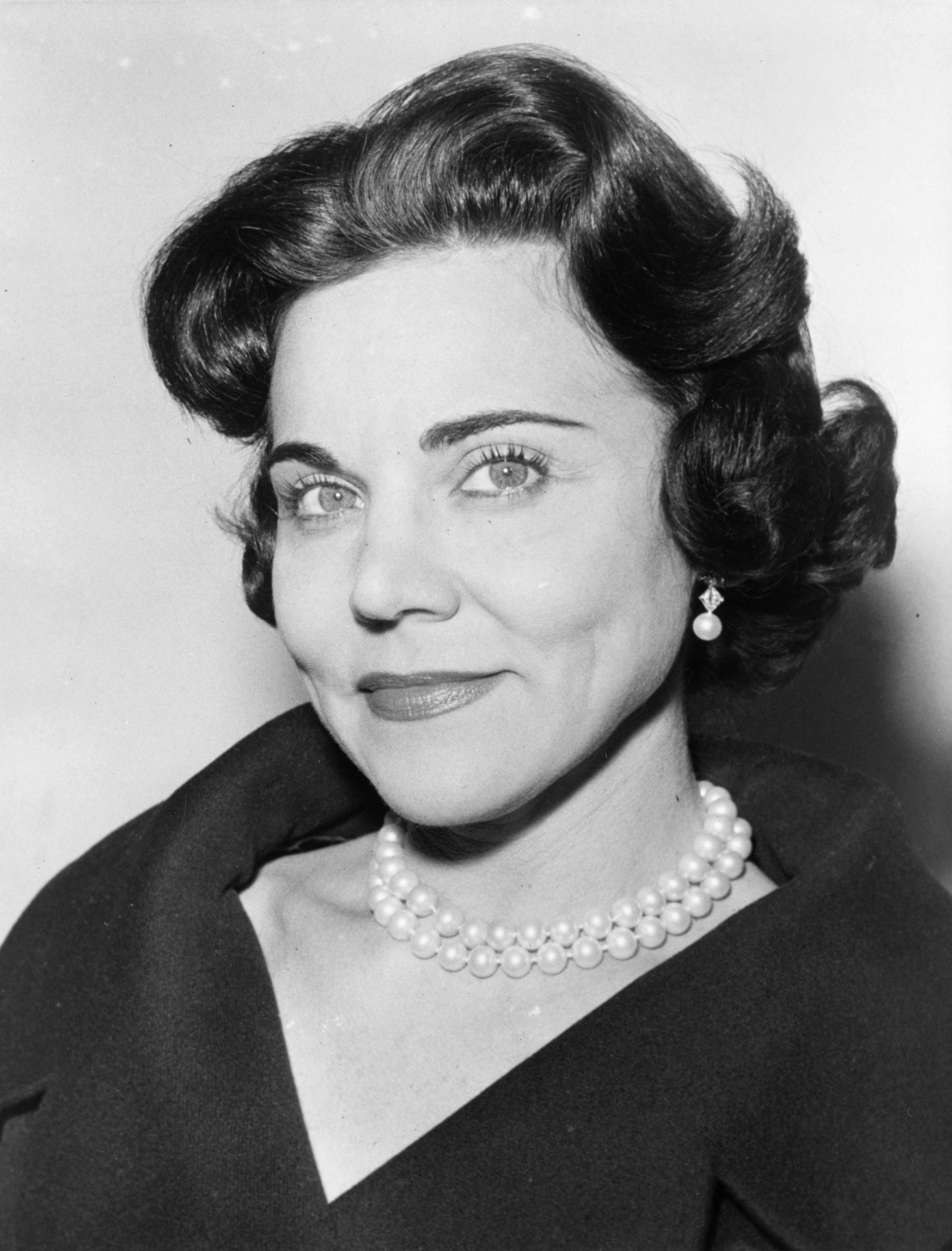
Ann Landers

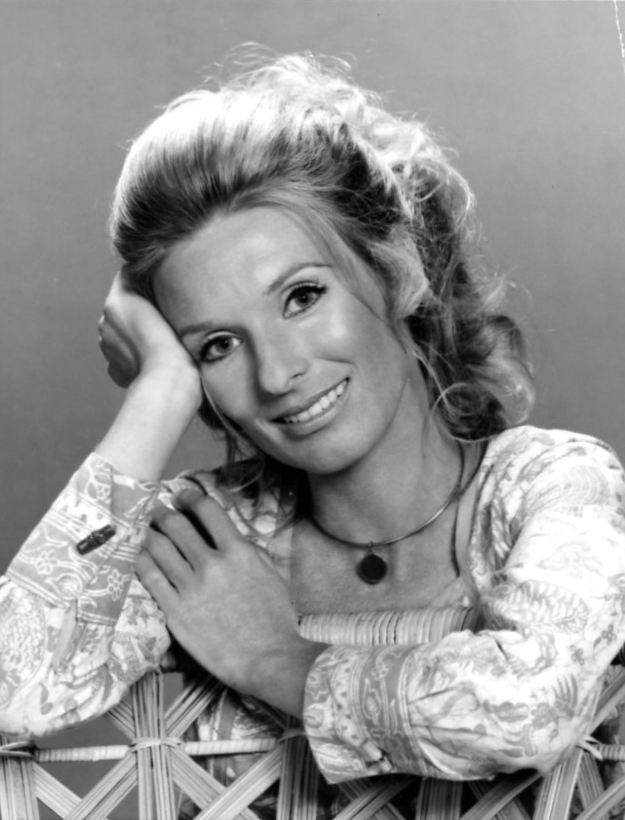
Cloris Leachman

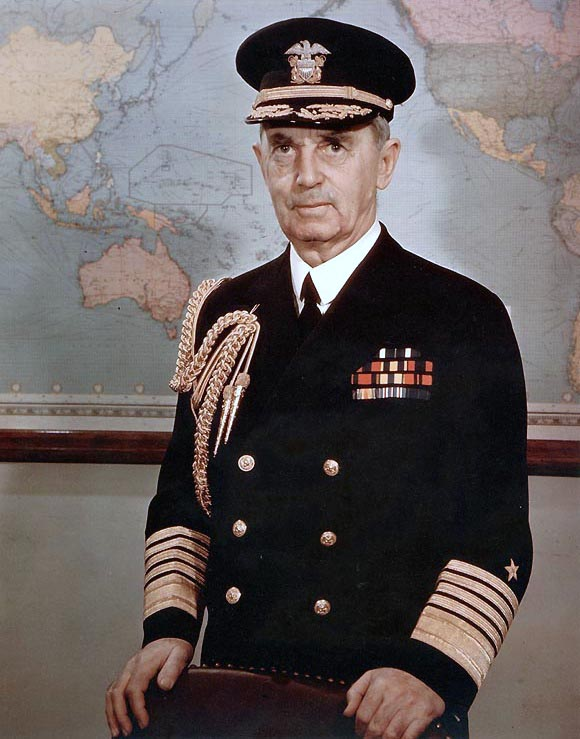
Fleet Admiral William D. Leahy

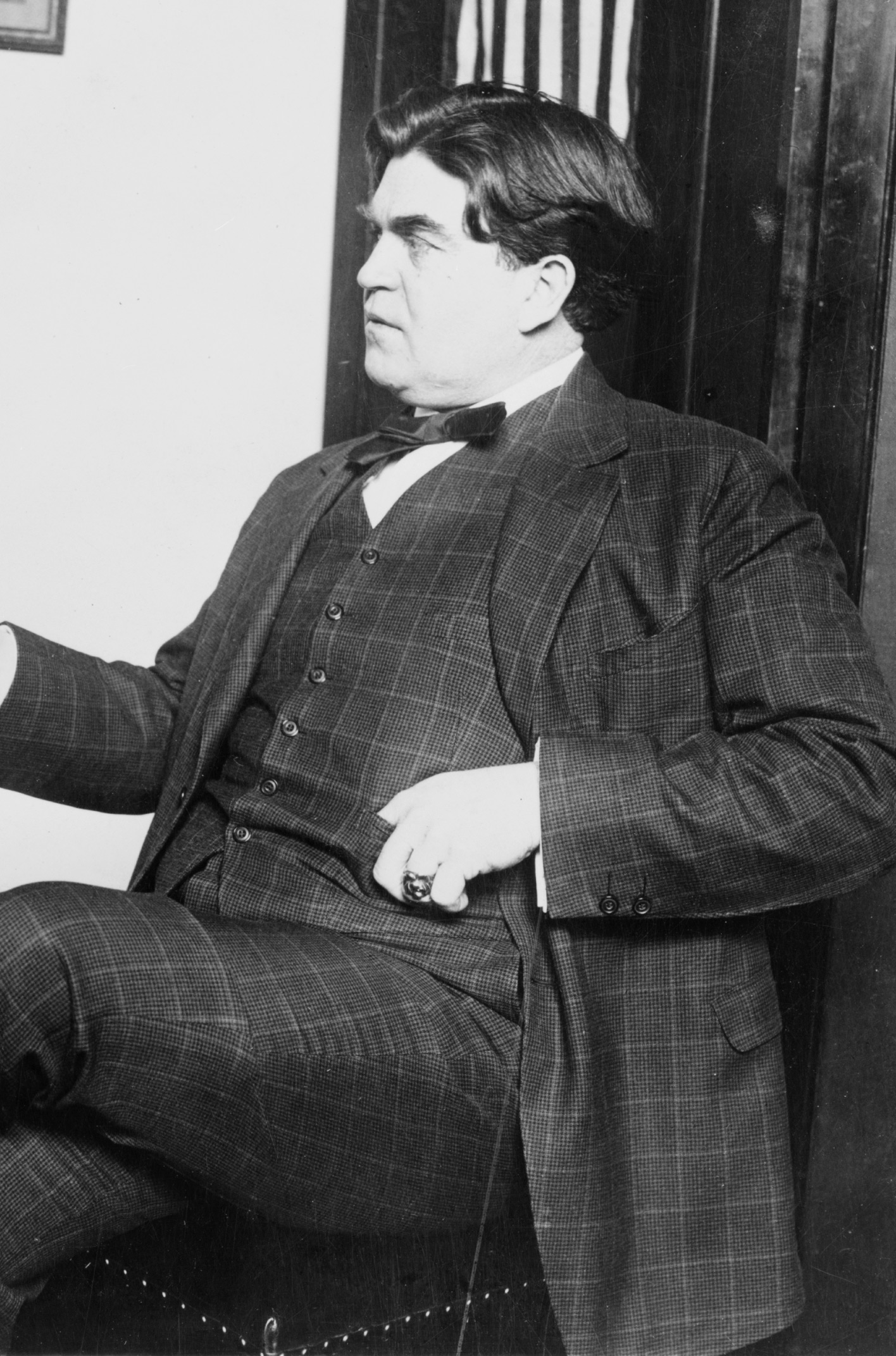
John L. Lewis

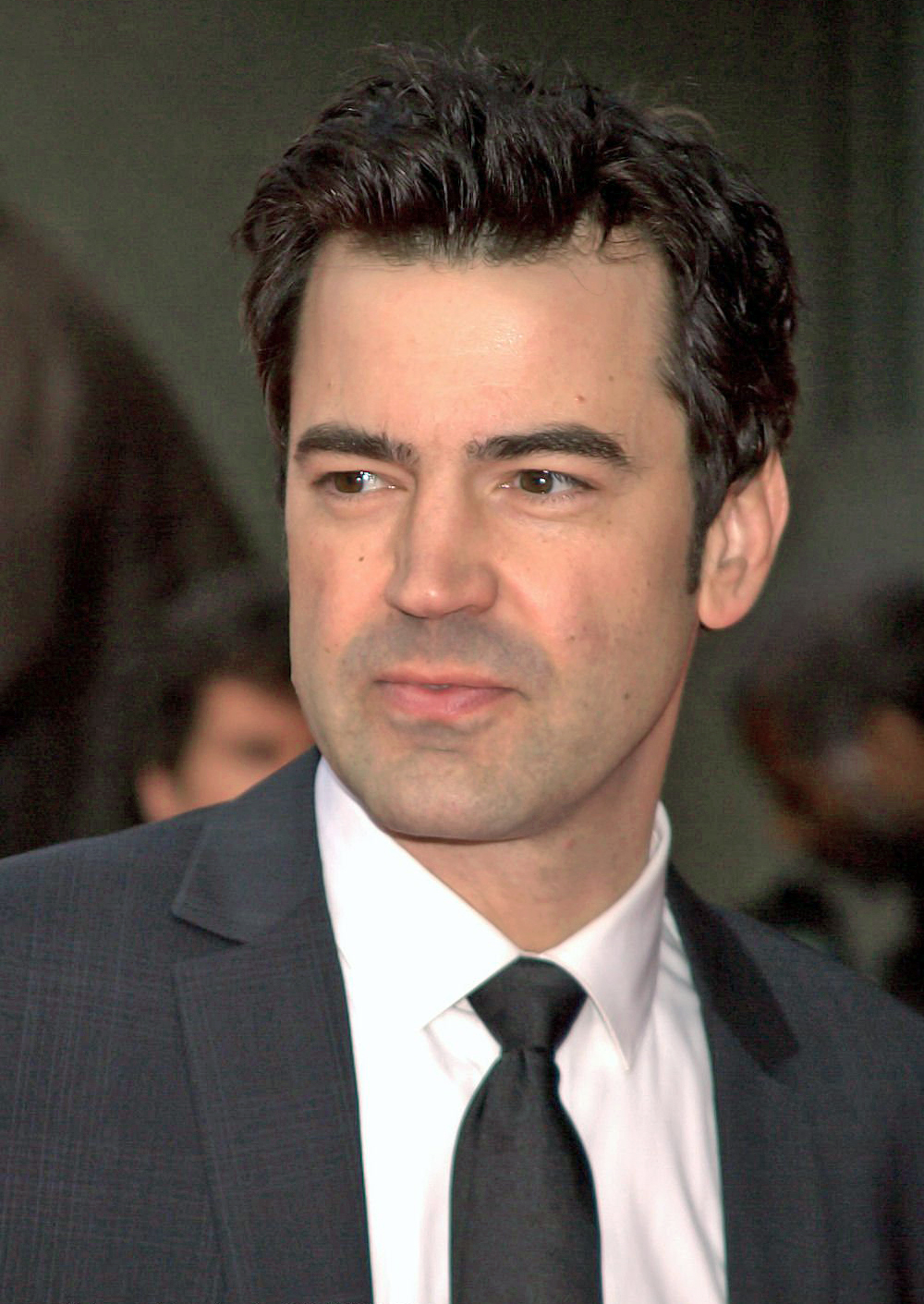
Ron Livingston

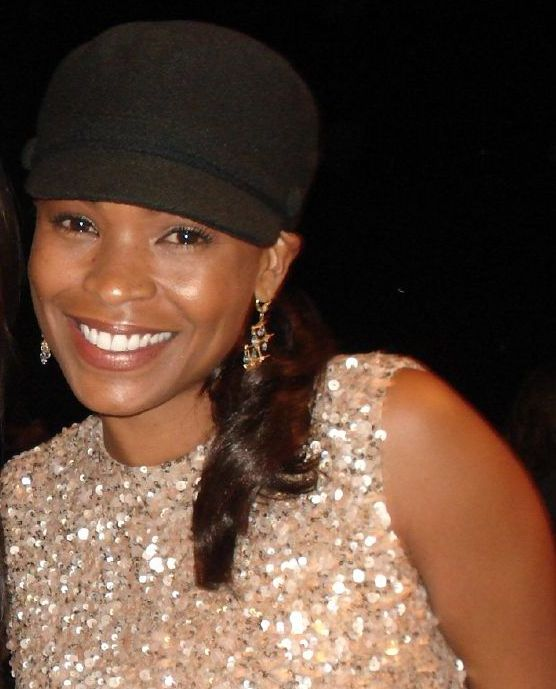
Nia Long

- Sarah Lacina, reality-television contestant
- Jerry Lacy, actor
- Perry Lafferty, television producer
- Doug La Follette, politician
- Raef LaFrentz, basketball player
- Roswell Lamson, Civil War officer
- Ann Landers, advice columnist
- The Lane Sisters, singers, actresses
- Harry Langdon, comedian
- Frank Lanning, actor
- Jeff Larish, baseball player
- Patty Larkin, singer
- Alan Larson (born 1949), diplomat and ambassador
- Mauricio Lasansky, graphic artist
- Tomas Lasansky, visual artist
- Joe Laws, basketball player
- Elmer Layden, football player, coach
- Jim Leach, politician
- Cloris Leachman, actress
- Frederick Leadbetter, financier
- William Daniel Leahy, naval officer
- William P. Leahy, university president
- Frances Lee, actress
- Gerald Leeman, Olympic freestyle wrestler
- Laura Leighton, actress
- Josh Lenz, football player
- Aldo Leopold, environmentalist
- Amy Leslie, opera singer
- Alexander Levi, religious leader
- Jack Lewis, screenwriter
- John Lewis, labor leader
- Jon Lieber, baseball player
- Thurlow Lieurance, composer
- Joe Lillard, athlete
- Edward Lindberg, athlete
- Everett Franklin Lindquist, educator
- Everett Lindsay, football player
- Margaret Lindsay, actress
- Ron Livingston, actor
- Bob Locker, baseball player
- Al Lohman, radio personality
- Babe London, comedian
- Chuck Long, football player, coach
- Nia Long, § actress
- Mathias Loras, religious leader
- Tyler Lorenzen, football player
- Kevin Love, auto racer
- Phyllis Love, actress
- Herschel C. Loveless, governor
- Robert Lucas, politician
- Larry Lujack, radio personality
- Tiny Lund, auto racer
- Mike Lynch, cartoonist
- Raymond J. Lynch, judge
- Emmett Lynn, actor
- Sue Lyon, actress

== M ==
=== Ma–Mg ===
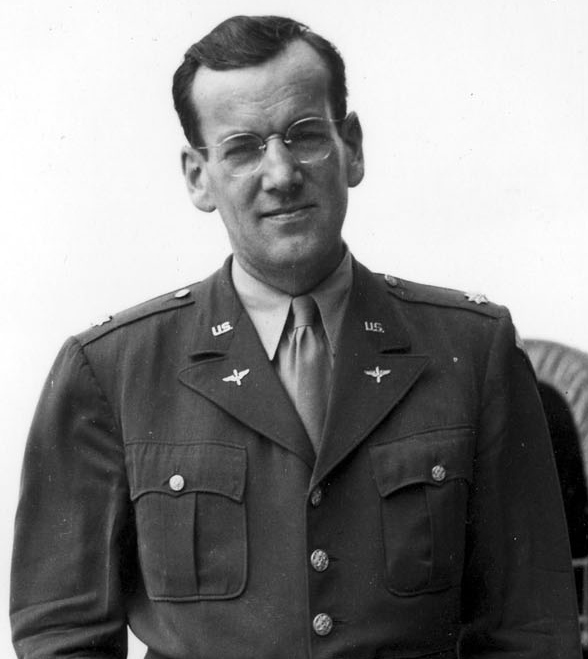
Glenn Miller

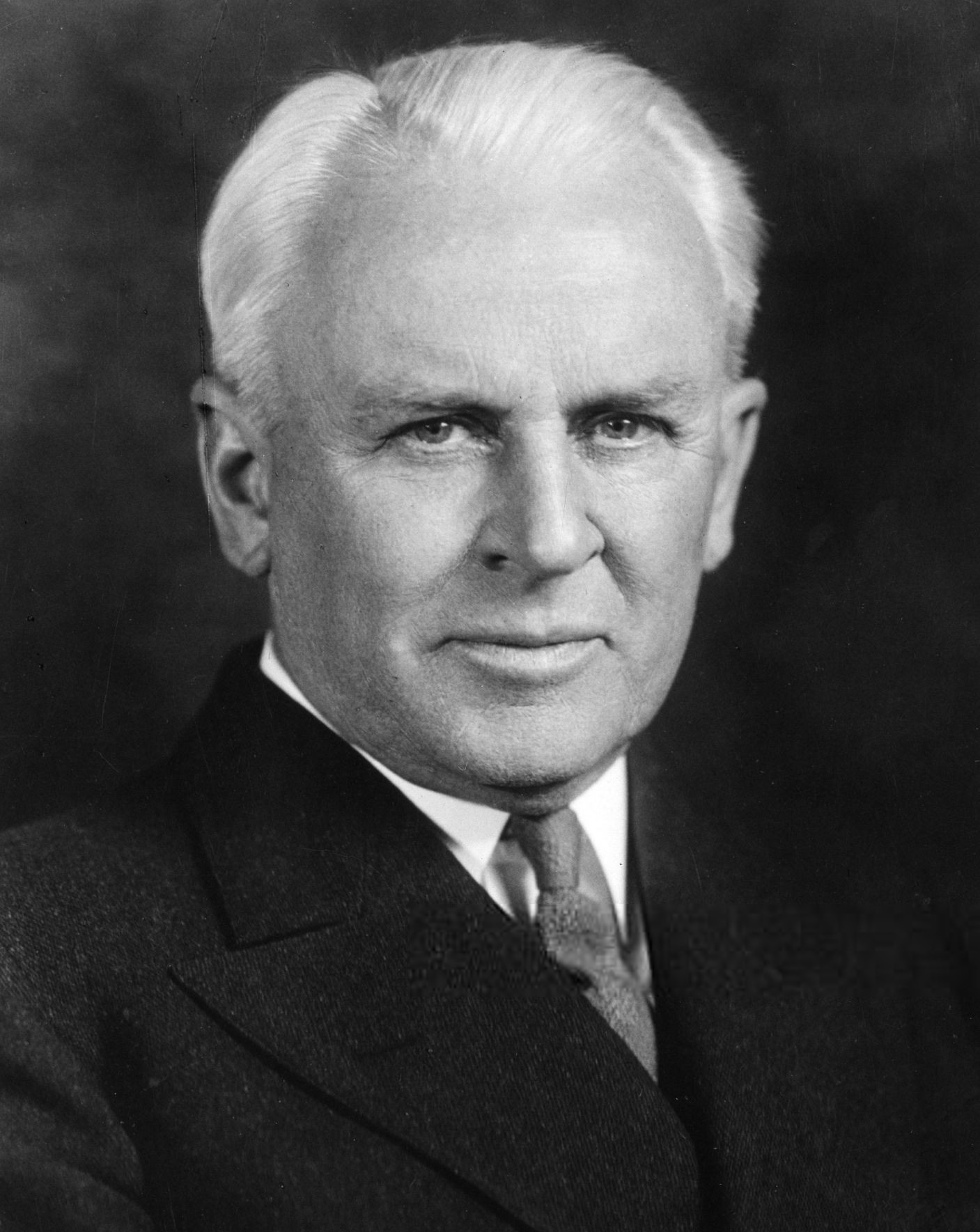
Robert Millikan, §

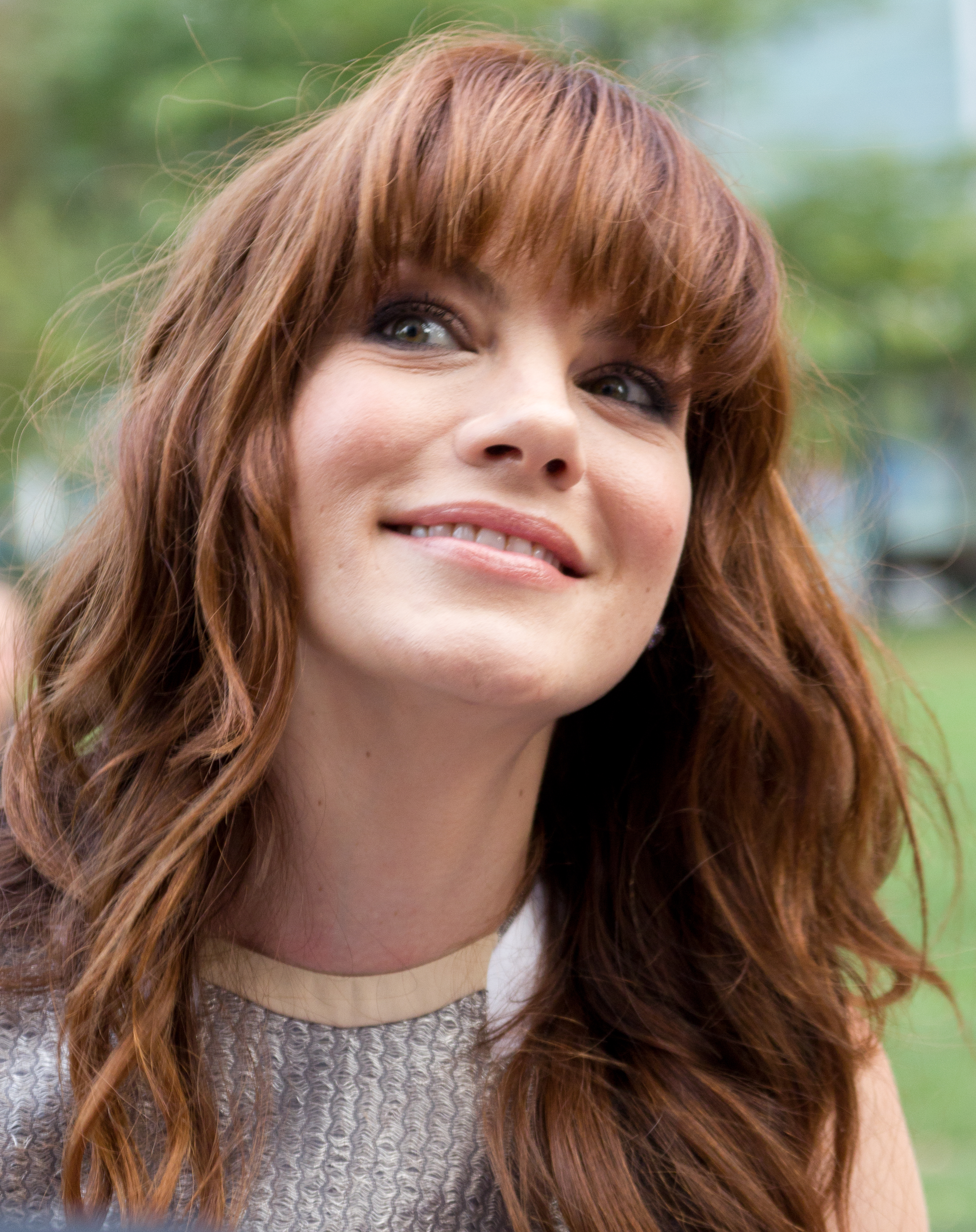
Michelle Monaghan

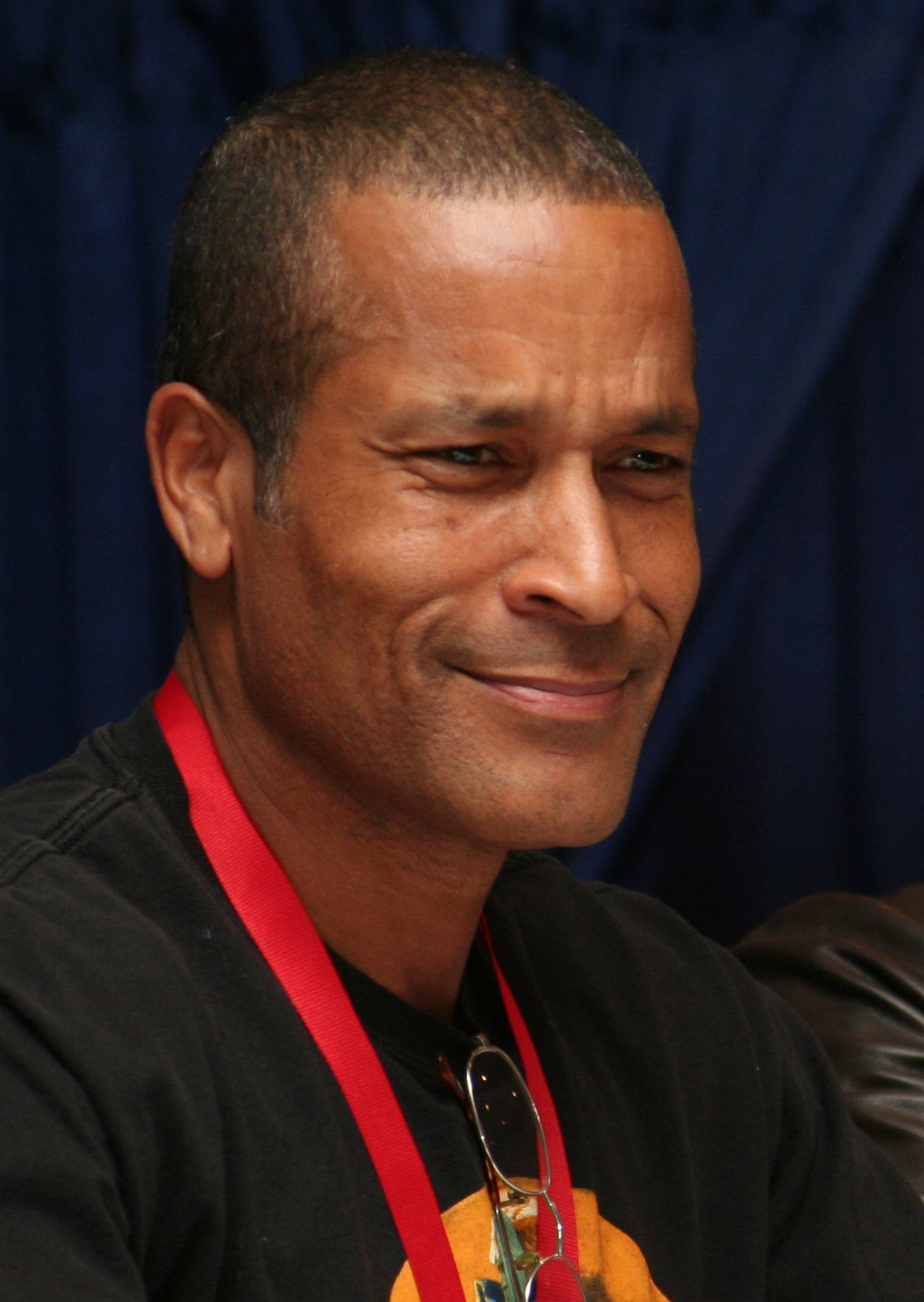
Phil Morris

- Larry Mac Duff, football coach
- Norman Maclean, professor, author
- Archer MacMackin, film director
- Hanford MacNider, diplomat, U.S. Army general
- Cletus Madsen, religious leader
- Joe Magrane, baseball player
- Maryann Mahaffey, politician
- Ryan Mahaffey, football player
- Mahaska, Native American chief
- Dennis Mahony, 19th-century journalist
- Anna Malle, § adult film actress
- Jessie Wilson Manning, writer, lecturer
- Arabella Mansfield, lawyer
- Stuart Margolin, actor
- Beth Marion, actress
- Glenn Martin, aviator
- Bernard Masterson, athlete
- Jerry Mathers, actor
- James Matheson, composer
- David Maxwell, university president
- Elsa Maxwell, columnist
- Marilyn Maxwell, actress
- Jesse May, poker professional
- Wiley Mayne, politician
- F. L. Maytag, founder of Maytag corporation
- Rita McBride, sculptor
- C. W. McCall, singer and politician
- Dan McCarney, football coach
- The McCaughey septuplets
- Tim McClelland, baseball umpire
- Al McCoy, announcer
- Greg McDermott, basketball coach
- William John McGee, geologist
- George McGill, politician
- Charles McGraw, actor
- Keli McGregor, baseball executive
- Pat McLaughlin, singer
- Sean McLaughlin, meteorologist
- William H. McMaster, former governor of South Dakota
- Cal McVey, baseball player
- Stu Mead, painter
- Carl Meinberg, priest
- John Melcher, former senator of Montana
- Michael Joseph Melloy, judge
- Denis Menke, baseball player
- Sebastian Menke, priest
- William Menster, priest
- Iris Meredith, actress
- Frank Merriam, former governor of California
- Russel Merrill, aviator
- Samuel Merrill, former governor of Iowa
- Nancy Metcalf, volleyball player
- Bernard F. Meyer, missionary
- Loren Meyer, basketball player

=== Mh–Mz ===
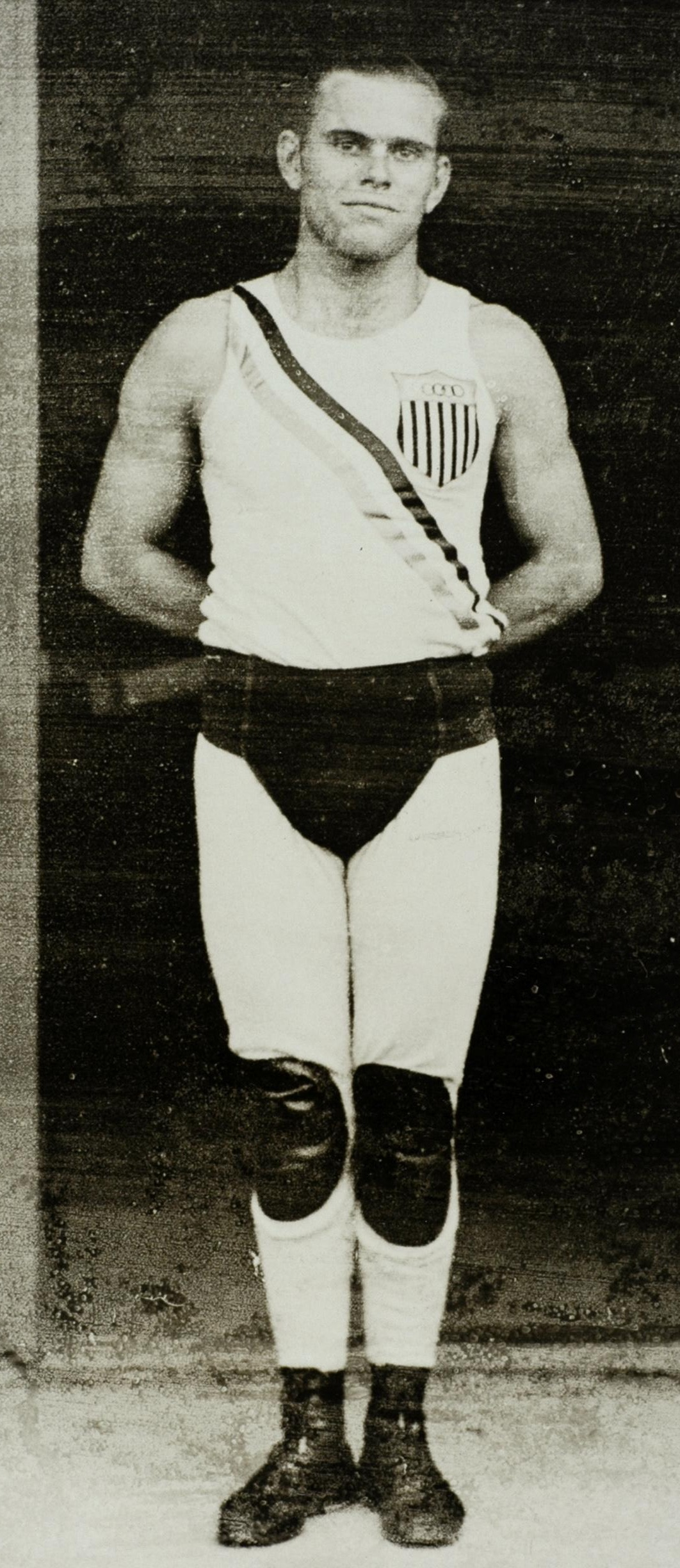
Allie Morrison

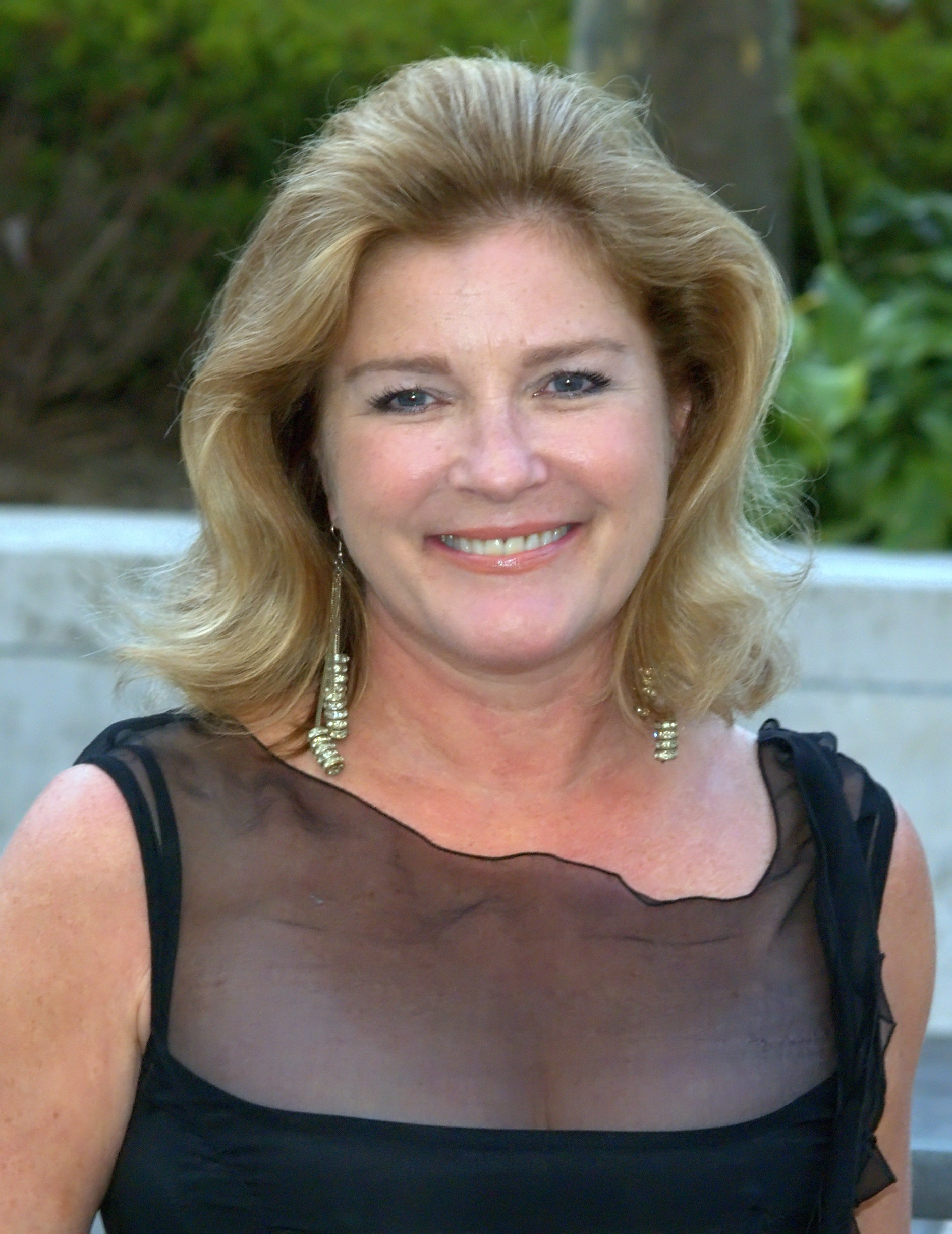
Kate Mulgrew

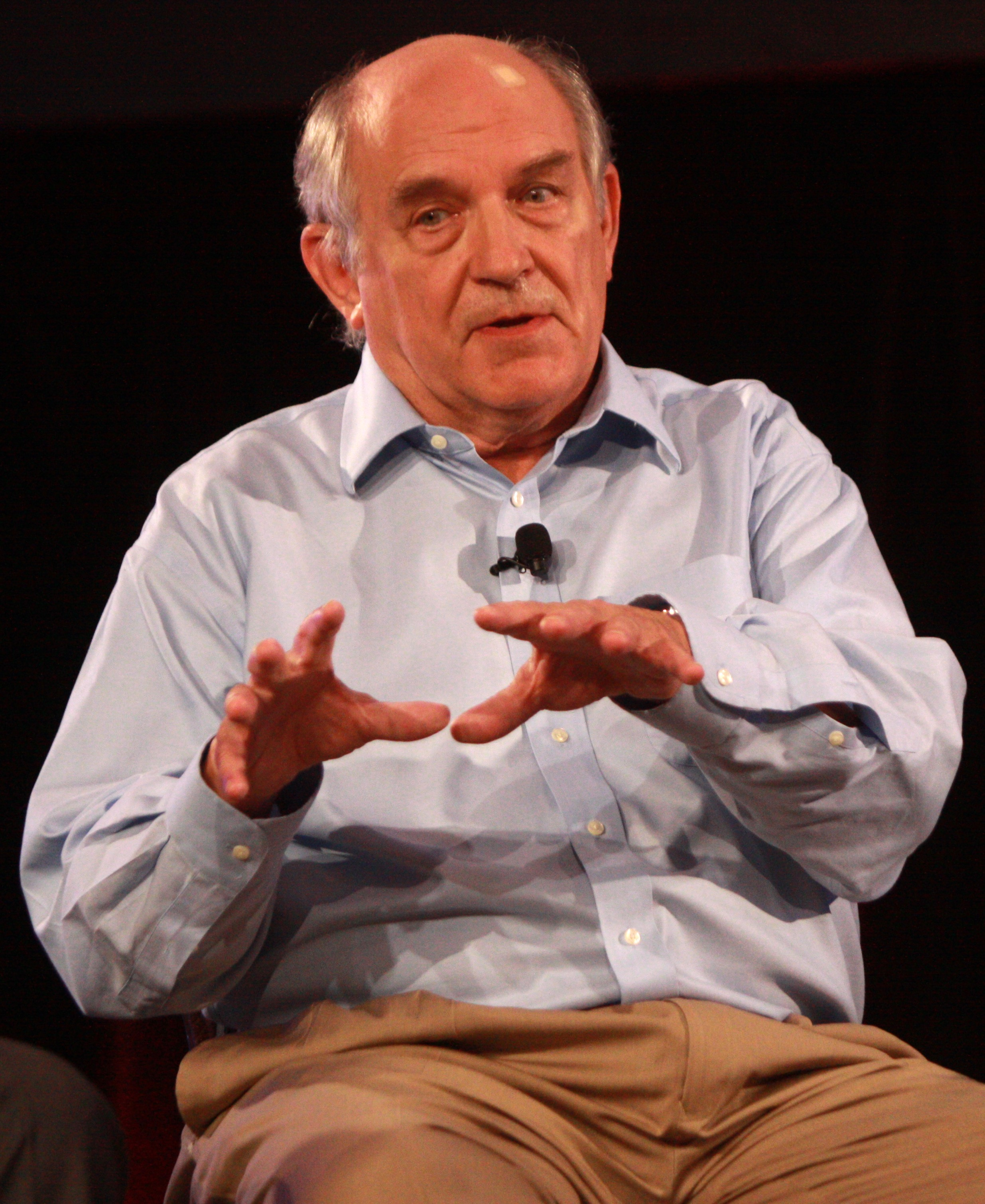
Charles Murray

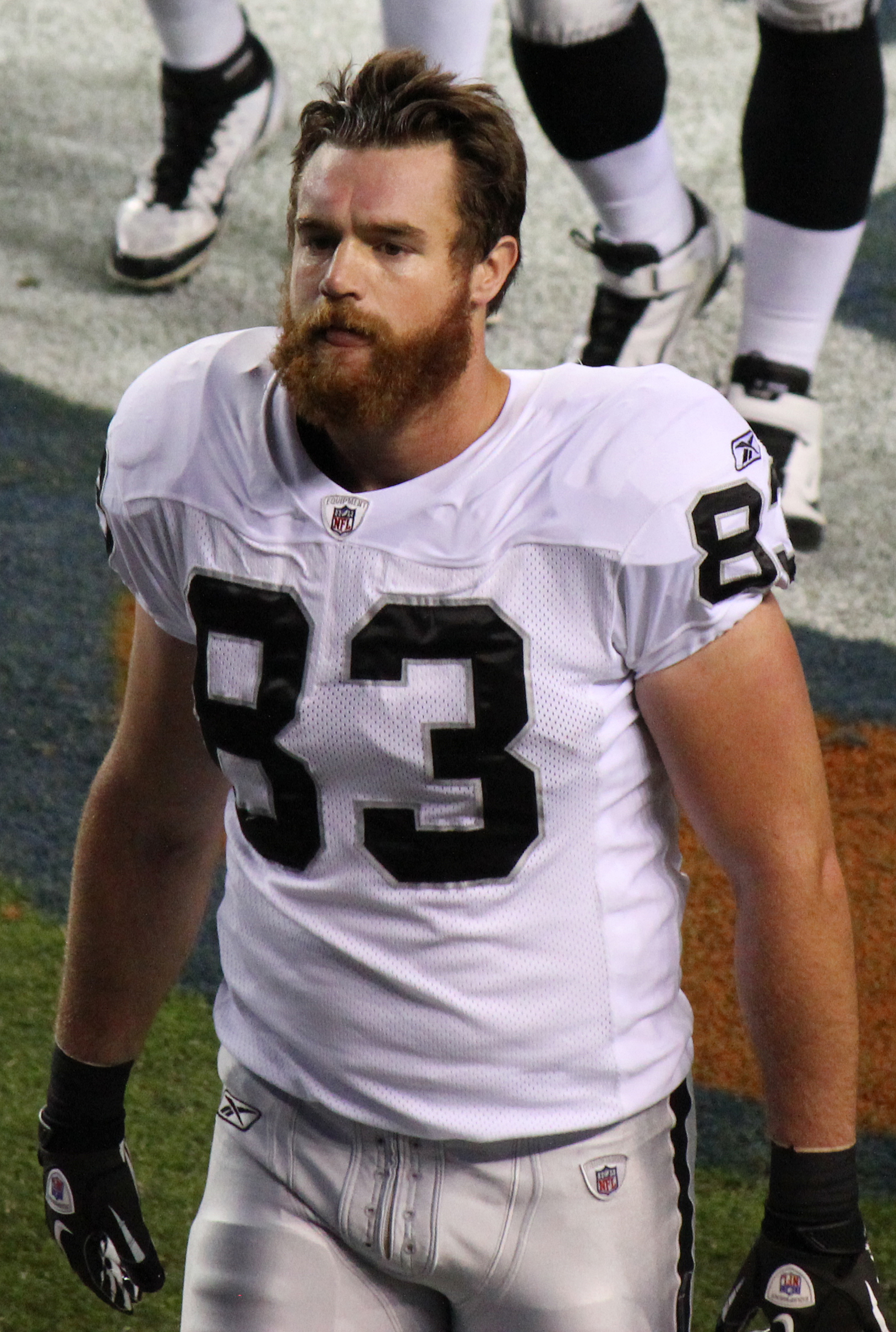
Brandon Myers

- Julia Michaels, singer-songwriter
- Brandon Middleton, football player
- Pat Miletich, MMA fighter, member of the UFC Hall of Fame
- Hugh Millen, football player
- Glenn Miller, musician, bandleader, World War II officer
- Samuel Freeman Miller, Supreme Court justice
- Robert Millikan, physicist
- M. W. Miles, politician and postmaster
- Jason Momoa, § actor
- Ted Monachino, football coach
- Michelle Monaghan, actress
- Jordan Monroe, model
- Constance Moore, actress
- Frank A. Moore, judge
- Hap Moran, football player
- Peggy Moran, actress
- Jeremy Morgan (born 1995), basketball player for Hapoel Jerusalem in the Israeli Basketball Premier League
- Karen Morley, actress
- Carol Morris, Miss Universe 1956
- Mike Morris, football player
- Phil Morris, actor
- Allie Morrison, Olympic freestyle wrestler
- Honoré Willsie Morrow, author, editor
- Karen Morrow, actress
- John Mosher, jazz musician and composer
- Michael Mosley, actor
- Dow Mossman, writer
- John Mott, YMCA leader, Nobel Prize winner
- Marvin Mottet, priest
- Kate Mulgrew, actress
- Richard L. Murphy, former Iowa senator
- Charles Murray, political scientist
- Brandon Myers, football player
- Virginia A. Myers, inventor

== N ==
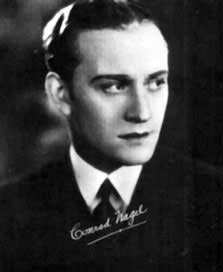
Conrad Nagel

- Nancy Naeve, television journalist
- Conrad Nagel, actor
- Neapope, Sauk leader
- Sharon Needles, drag performer
- Brad Nelson, baseball player
- George Nelson, NASA astronaut
- Harriet Nelson, actress, television personality
- Larry Nemmers, football official
- Carman A. Newcomb, politician
- Jim Nicholson, politician
- Bruce Nissen, professor
- Ken Nordine, voice-over artist
- Lance Norris, actor
- Bill Northey, politician
- Robert Noyce, inventor
- Michael Nunn, boxer
- Nick Nurse, basketball head coach

== O ==
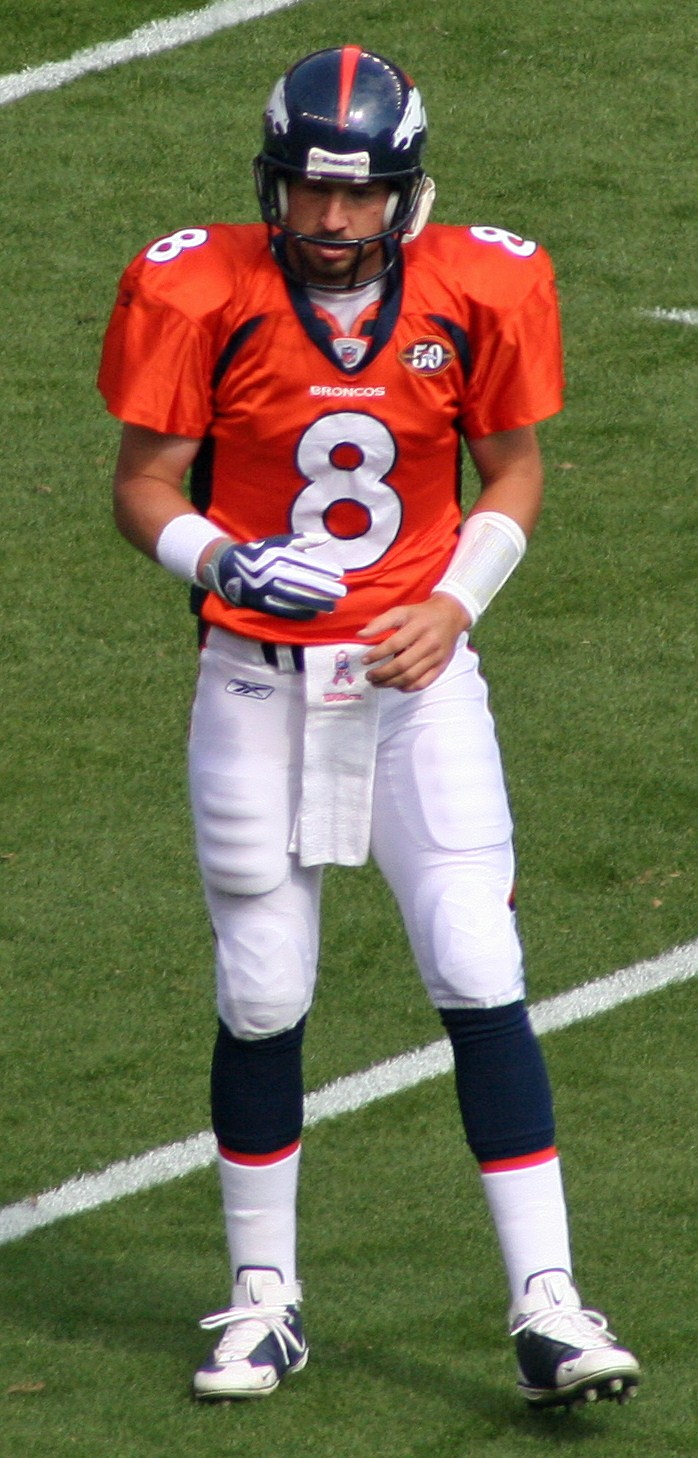
Kyle Orton

- Randi Oakes, actress, fashion model
- Dick Oatts, musician
- Wes Obermueller, baseball player
- Patrick O'Bryant, basketball player
- Brian O'Connor, § baseball coach
- Dennis O'Keefe, actor
- Gerald Francis O'Keefe, religious leader
- Bob Oldis, baseball player, coach, scout
- George Olmsted, military officer
- Eric Christian Olsen, actor
- Zoe Ann Olsen-Jensen, Olympic diver
- James Bradley Orman, former governor of Colorado
- Kay A. Orr, former governor of Nebraska
- Kyle Orton, football player
- Charles Osborne, "hiccup" man
- Vivienne Osborne, actress
- Beverley Owen, actress

== P ==
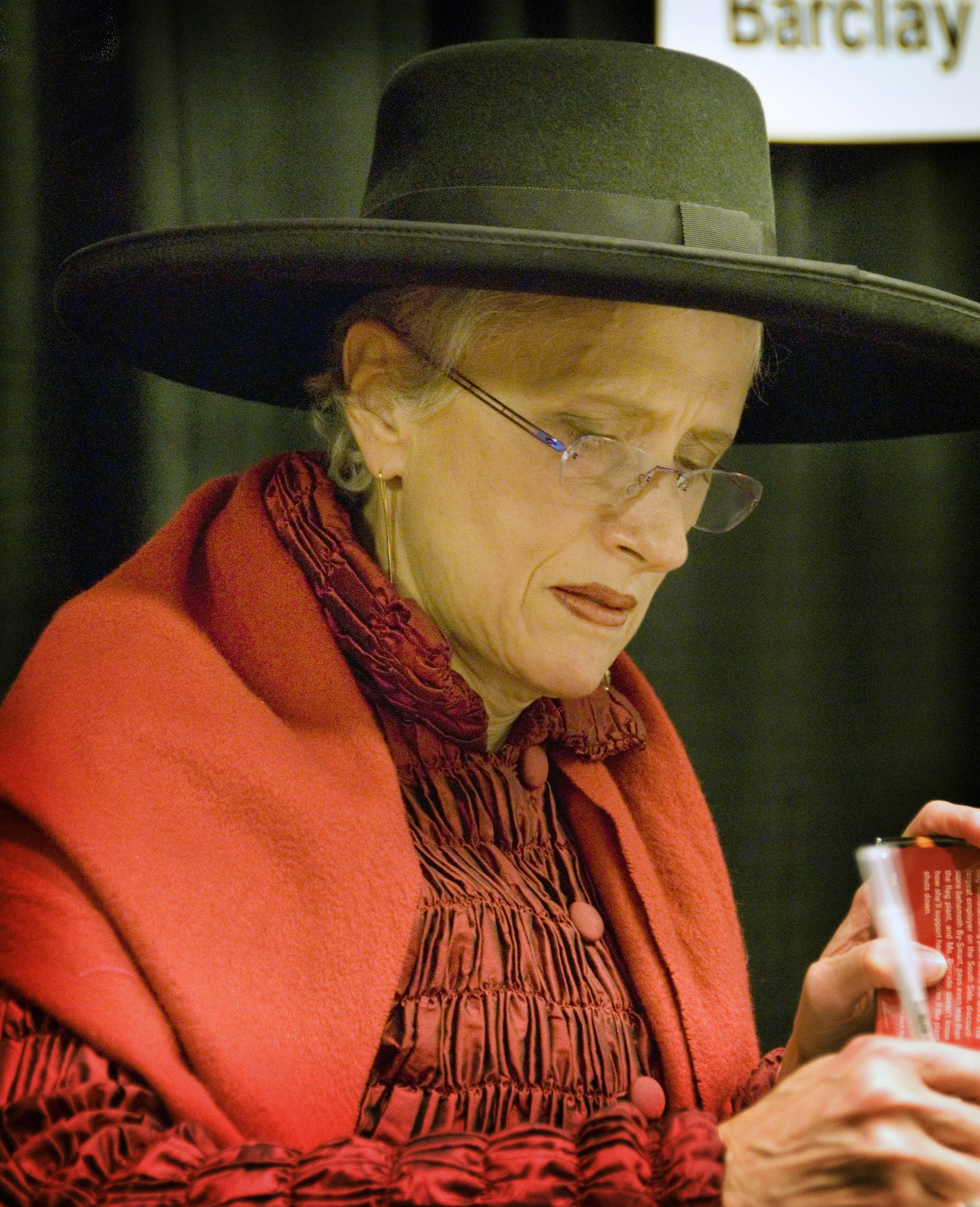
Sara Paretsky

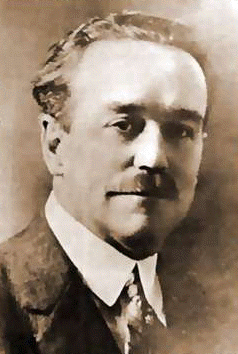
Charles Fox Parham

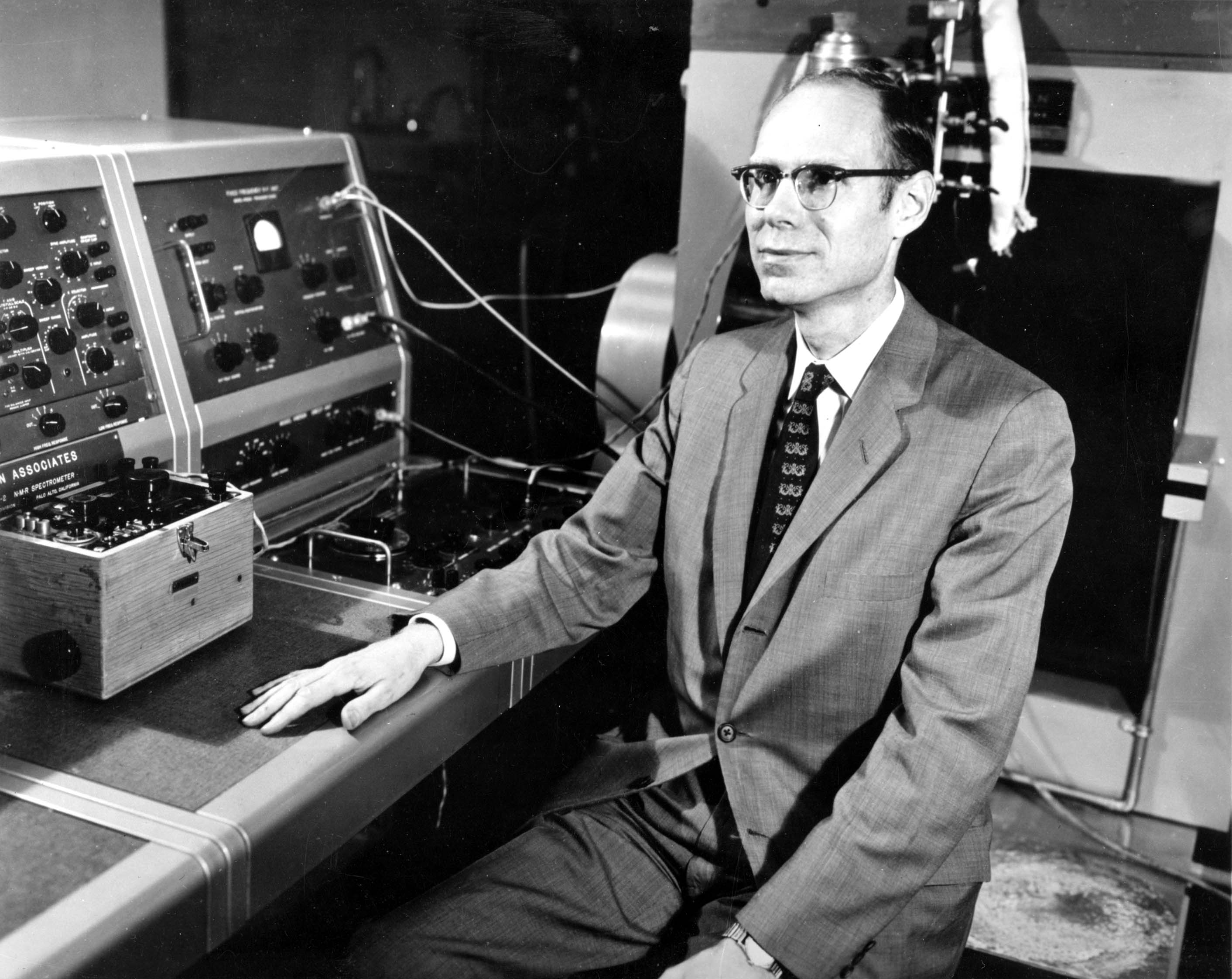
John Robinson Pierce

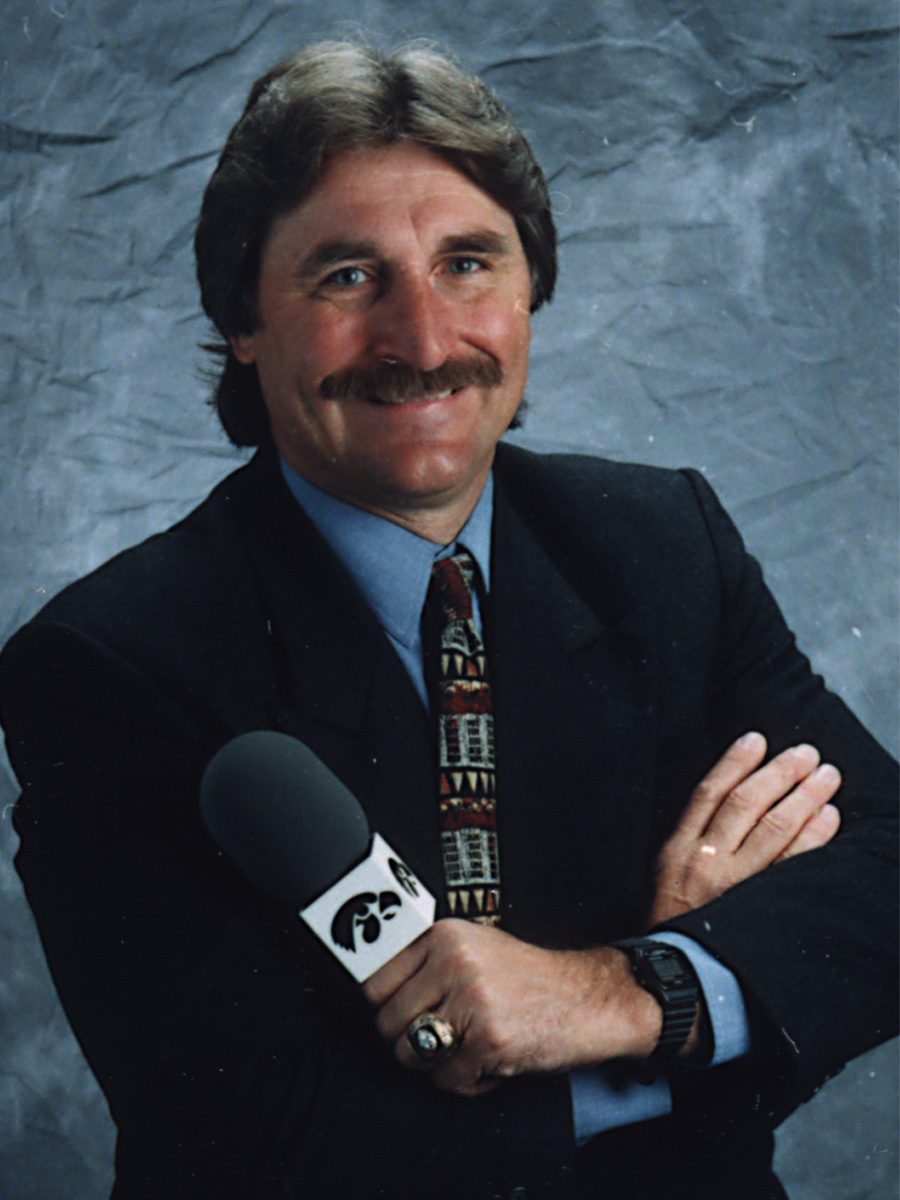
Ed Podolak

- Stephen Paddock, mass murderer
- Richard Page, front man for Mr. Mister
- Daniel David Palmer, chiropractic medicine pioneer
- Francis W. Palmer, publisher
- Rose Marie Pangborn, scientist
- Oran Pape, law enforcement officer
- Ralph Parcaut, professional wrestler
- Sara Paretsky, novelist
- Charles Fox Parham, evangelist
- Anthony Parker, basketball player
- Clair Cameron Patterson, geochemist
- Neva Patterson, actress
- Allen E. Paulson, thoroughbred breeder
- Bryce Paup, football player
- Claude Payton, actor
- Maria Pearson, Dakota activist
- Maria Purdy Peck, essayist, social economist, civic leader
- Sally Pederson, former lieutenant governor
- Paul Peek, politician
- Mary Beth Peil, actress
- Nat Pendleton, athlete, actor
- Arthur D. Pennington, baseball player
- Tom Pepper, computer programmer
- Don Perkins, football player
- Edwin Perkins, inventor
- Roger Perry, actor
- Pete Peterson, combat pilot, ambassador
- Roger Peterson, pilot
- Joseph M. Petrick, screenwriter
- Lori Petty, actress
- James Philbrook, actor
- John Robinson Pierce, engineer
- Mark Pinter, actor
- Chris Pirillo, video host, blogger
- Ed Podolak, football player
- Carl Pohlad, financier, Minnesota Twins owner
- George Pomutz, Civil War general
- Maddie Poppe, musician and winner of American Idol season 16
- Scott Pose, baseball player
- Dante Powell, stand-up comedian
- Gordon Prange, historian
- Beatrice Prentice, actress
- Hiram Price, railroad president, politician
- Richard Proenneke, naturalist
- Stanley Prusiner, neurologist, biochemist
- Tom Purtzer, golfer

== Q ==
- Quashquame, Sauk chief
- John Herbert Quick, author
- Howard 'Howdy' Quicksell, musician
- Linnea Quigley, actress

== R ==
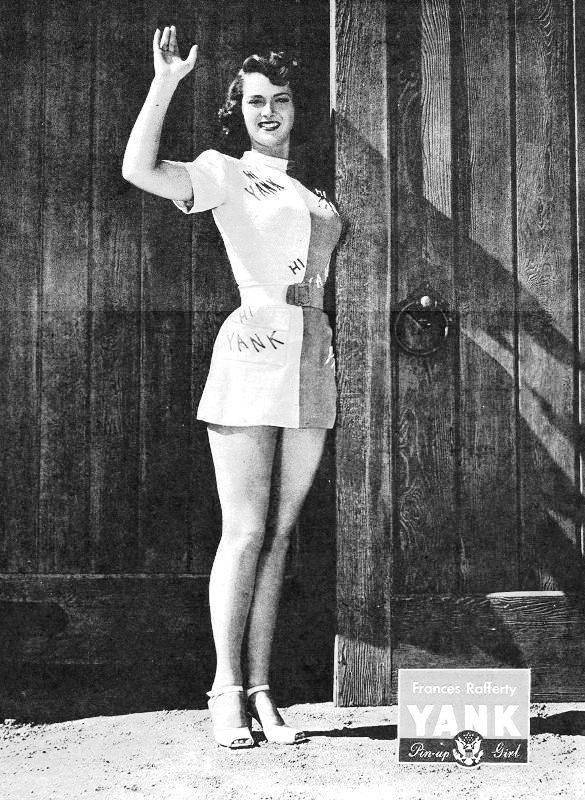
Frances Rafferty

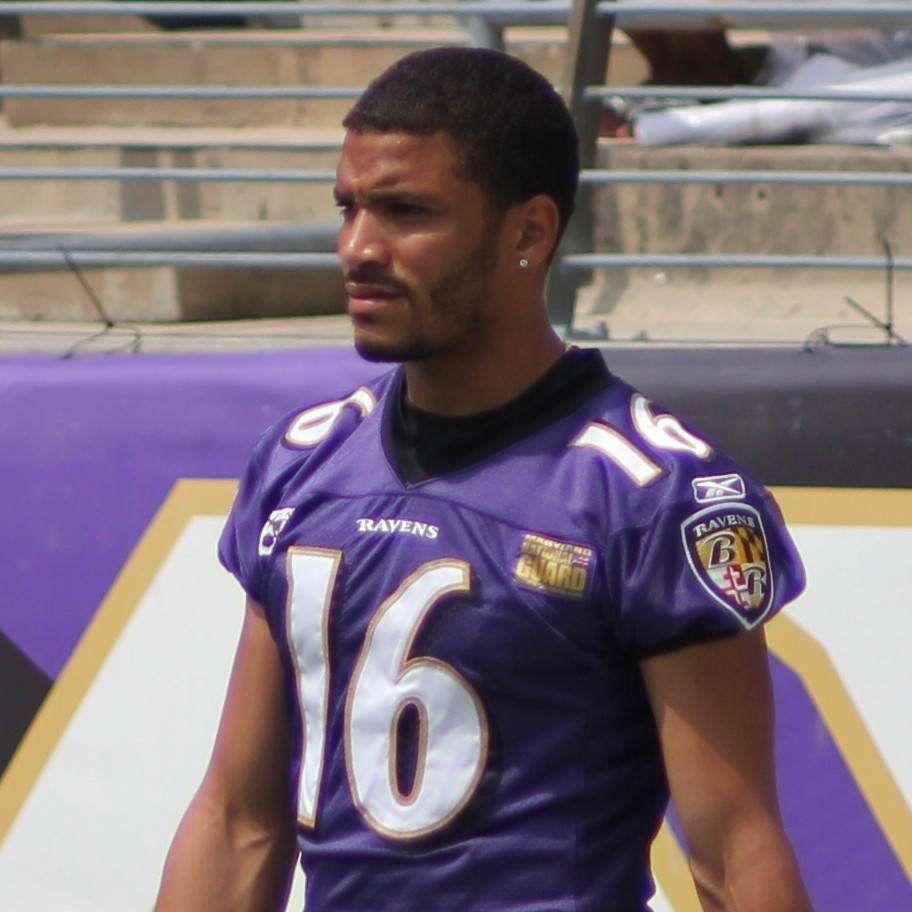
David Reed

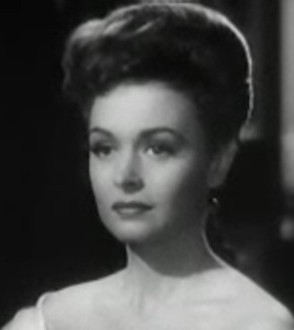
Donna Reed

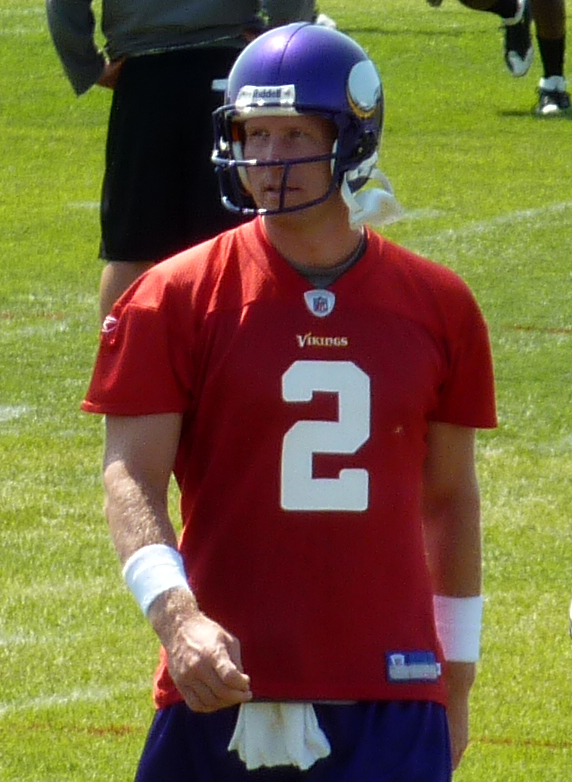
Sage Rosenfels

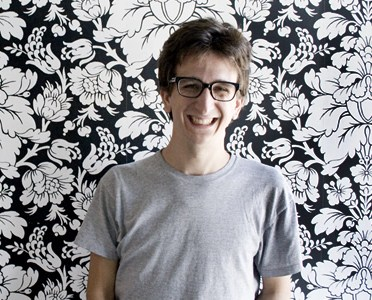
Paul Rust

- David Rabe, playwright
- Frances Rafferty, actress
- Max Rafferty, writer, politician
- John F. Rague, architect
- Randy Rahe, basketball coach
- Josh Rand, musician
- Robert D. Ray, governor of Iowa (1969–1983) who served several consecutive terms
- Harry Reasoner, television journalist
- David Reed, football player
- Donna Reed, actress
- Dani Reeves, Miss Iowa 2007
- George Reeves, actor
- Allen Reisner, football player
- George C. Remey, Civil War admiral
- Walter E. Reno, World War II naval officer
- Kevin Rhomberg, baseball player
- Alfred C. Richmond, admiral
- Doug Riesenberg, football player
- William H. Riker, political scientist
- Bill Riley Sr., entertainer
- Chad Rinehart, football player
- The Ringling brothers, circus moguls
- Mike Ritland, Navy SEAL, dog trainer, interviewer
- Clifford Roberts, chairman of Masters golf tournament
- James B. A. Robertson, judge, governor of Oklahoma
- Billy Robinson, aviator
- Shawna Robinson, auto racer
- Reggie Roby, football player
- Otto Frederick Rohwedder, inventor
- Seth Rollins, WWE professional wrestler
- Christine Romans, television journalist
- James Root, musician
- Jim Root, musician
- Raymond Roseliep, poet
- Sage Rosenfels, football player
- Joseph Rosenfield, lawyer
- Lawrence Sullivan Ross, Civil War general, governor of Texas
- Brandon Routh, actor
- Coleen Rowley, FBI agent, politician
- J. Craig Ruby, basketball coach
- Nate Ruess, singer
- Alexander Rummler, painter
- Nicholas J. Rusch, Civil War officer, politician
- Arthur Russell, musician
- Charles Edward Russell, journalist
- Lillian Russell, actress
- Paul Rust, comedian
- George Ryan, former governor of Illinois

== S ==
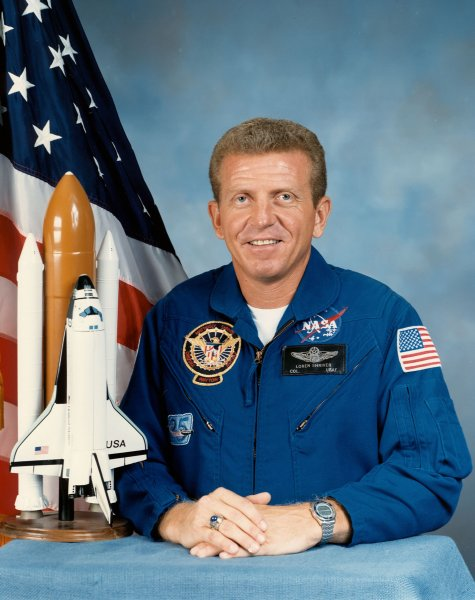
Loren Shriver

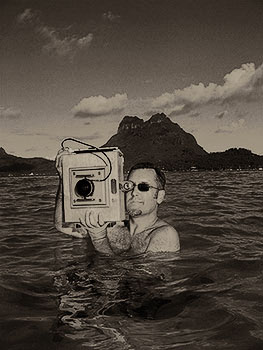
Brian Smith

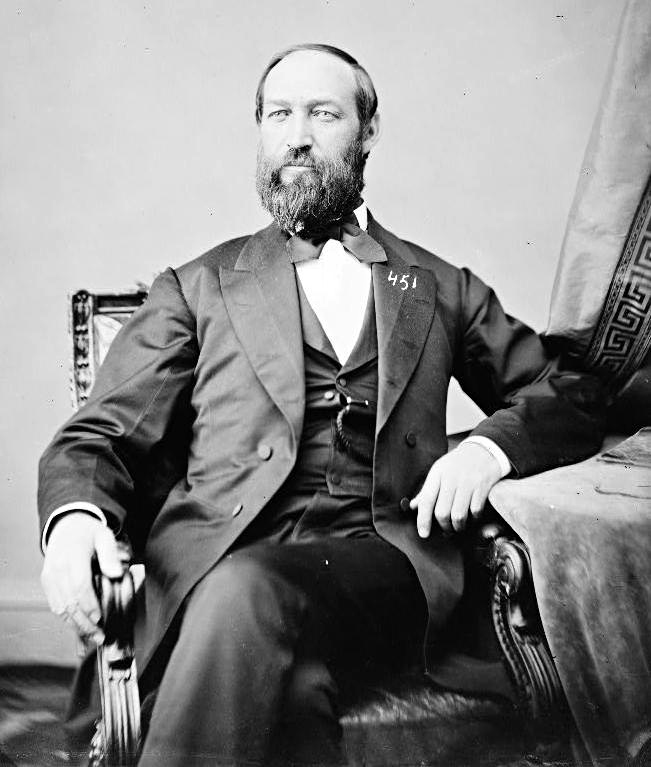
William Smyth

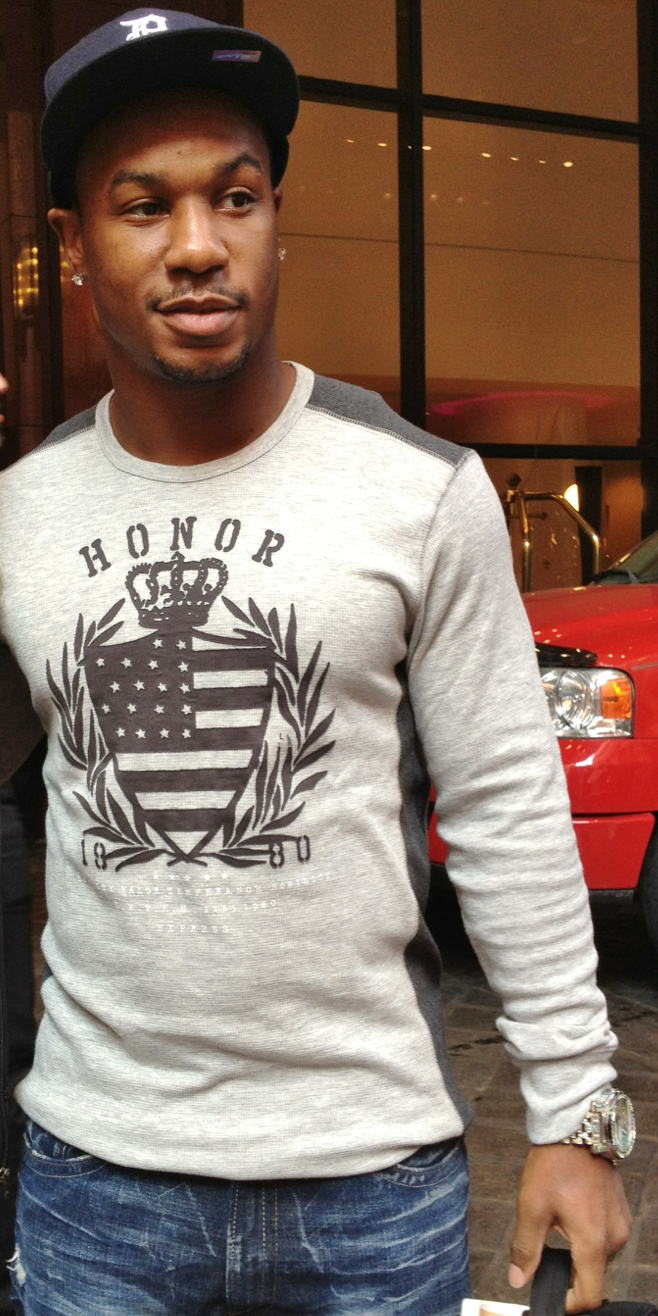
Darren Sproles

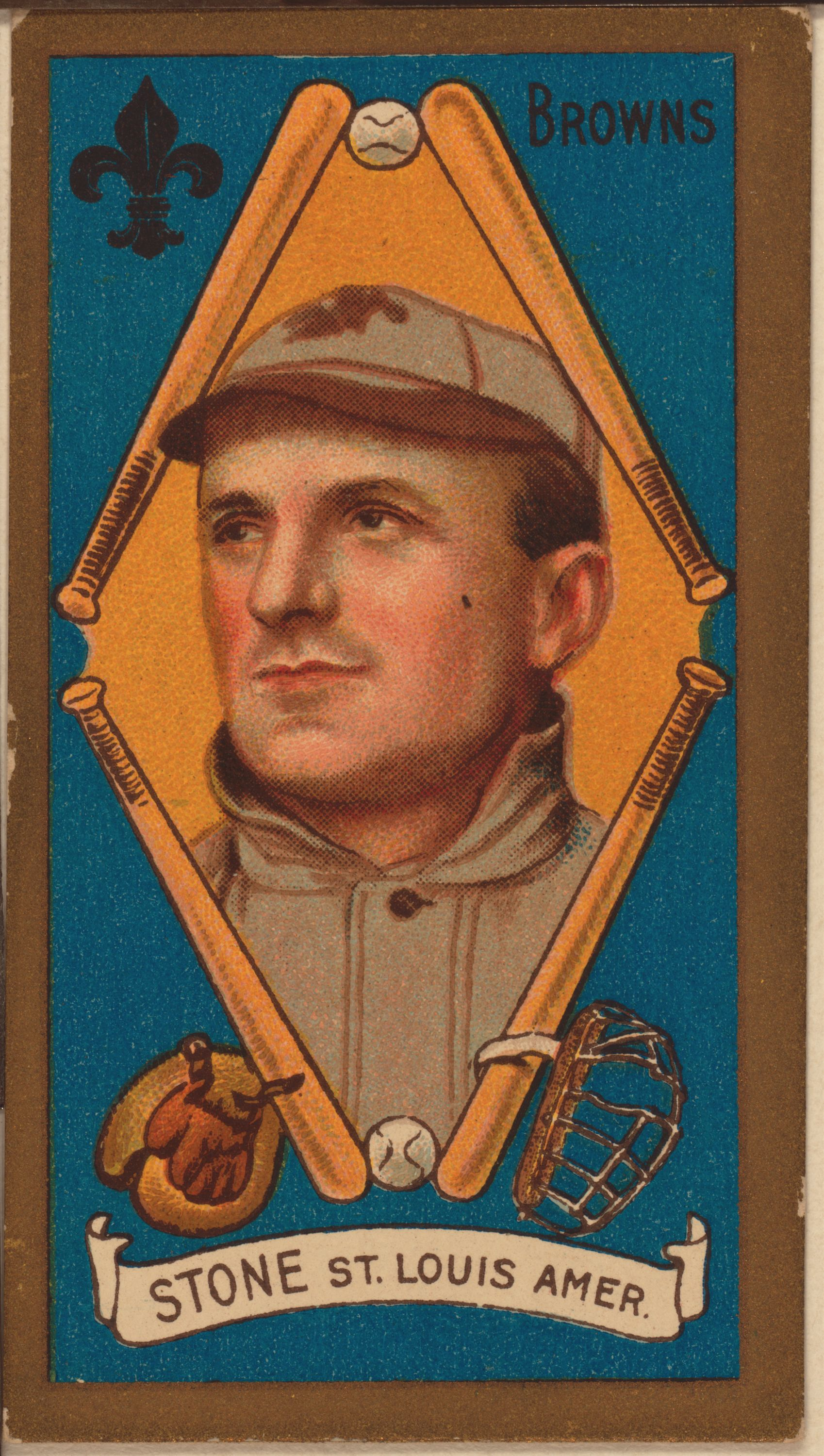
George Stone

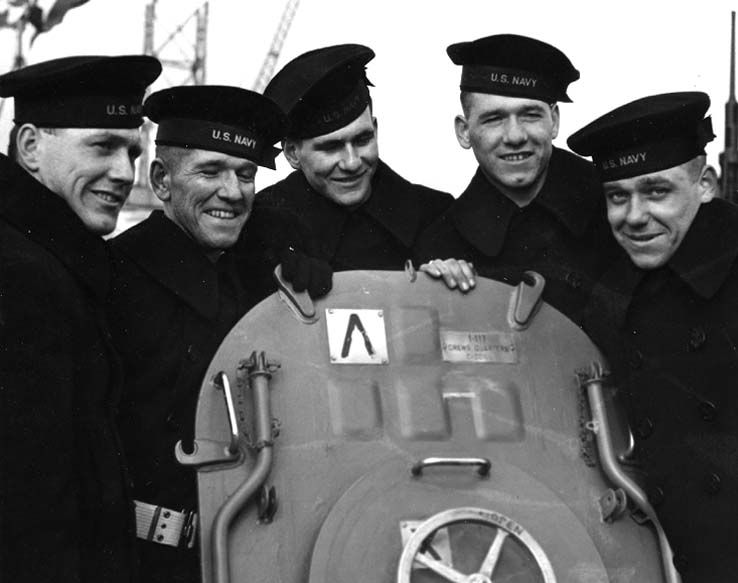
The Sullivan Brothers

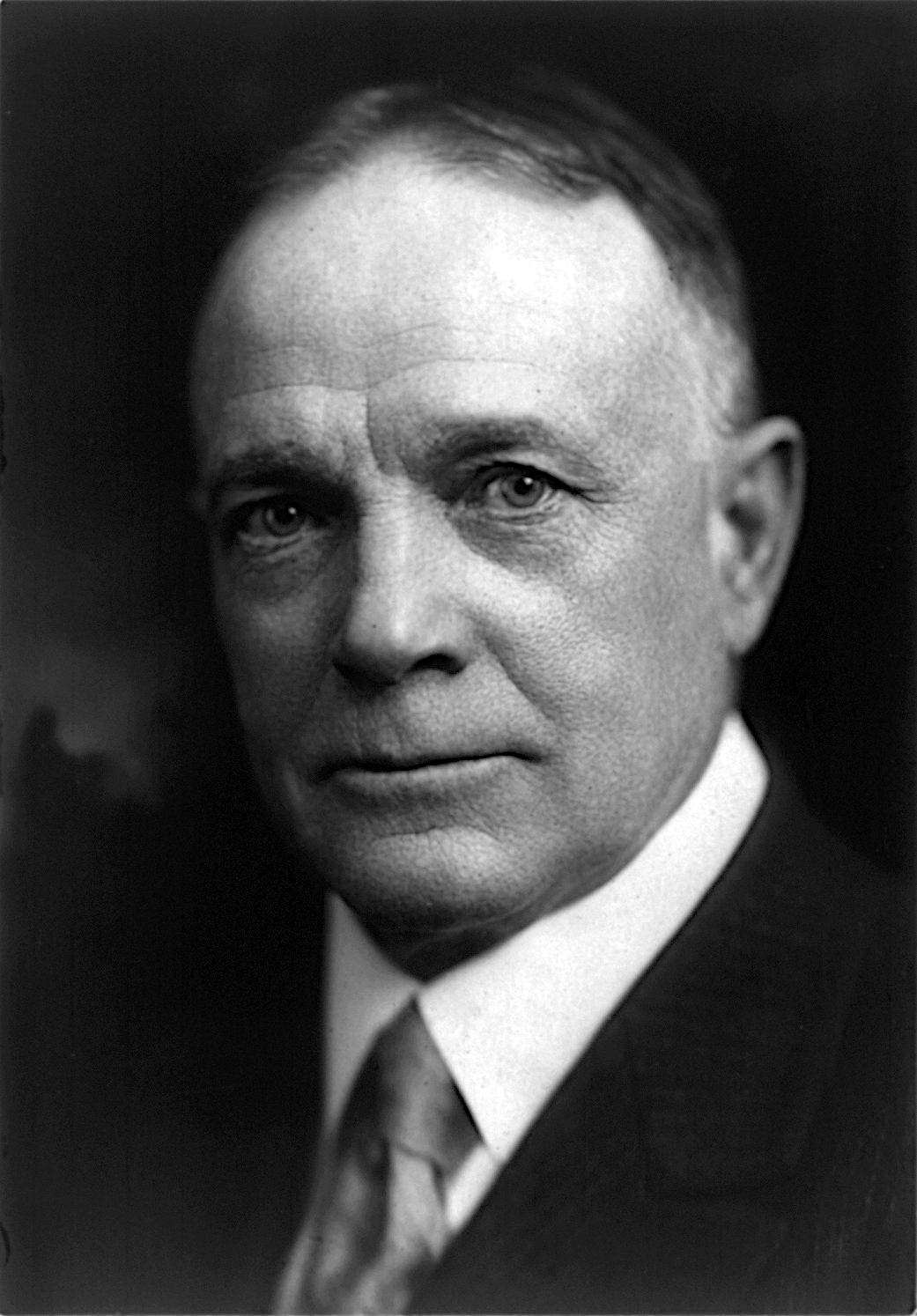
Billy Sunday

- George Saling, athlete
- Mark Salter, political speechwriter
- Josh Samman, mixed martial artist
- Ezekiel S. Sampson, Civil War officer, politician
- Cael Sanderson, § Olympic freestyle wrestler, wrestling coach
- Tyler Sash, football player
- Sauganash, fur trader
- A. J. Schable, football player
- Daniel Schaefer, politician
- Peter Schickele, parodist
- Ron Schipper, football coach
- Aloysius Schmitt, Navy chaplain
- Ernest B. Schoedsack, filmmaker
- Robert H. Schuller, religious leader
- Aloysius Schulte, college president
- Dick Schultz, NCAA and US Olympic Committee executive
- Jean Seberg, actress
- Brad Seely, football coach
- Edward Robert Sellstrom, pilot
- Phil Shafer, auto racer
- William Shannahan, priest
- Kenny Shedd, football player
- Kate Shelley, railroad official
- Gene Sherman, sportscaster
- Randy Shilts, journalist
- Paul Shorey, scholar
- Loren Shriver, astronaut
- Lee Paul Sieg, university president
- Hal Skelly, actor
- Bill Smith, § Olympic freestyle wrestler
- Brian Smith, photographer
- Gerald W. Smith, author
- Hiram Y. Smith, politician
- Jerry Smith, golfer
- Mary Louise Smith, politician
- Neal Smith, politician
- Riley Smith, actor
- Virginia Smith, politician
- Warren Allen Smith, gay rights advocate
- Clement Smyth, religious leader
- William Smyth, politician
- Neta Snook, aviator
- Jamie Solinger, Miss Teen USA
- Harvey Sollberger, composer
- Phyllis Somerville, actress
- Hartzell Spence, military journalist
- Tracie Spencer, singer
- Kirk Speraw, basketball coach
- Darren Sproles, football player
- Josh Stamer, football player
- Edwin O. Stanard, politician
- Denise Stapley, Survivor champion, therapist
- Bradley Steffens, author
- William G. Steiner, child advocate
- Mark Steines, television personality
- Keith H. Steinkraus, food scientist
- Frank Steunenberg, Idaho governor
- Bill Stewart, jazz musician
- George F. Stewart, food scientist
- Kiah Stokes, basketball player
- George Stone (1876–1945), Major League Baseball left fielder; 1906 American League batting champion
- Ramo Stott, auto racer
- Terry Stotts, basketball coach
- George L. Stout, art historian, "Monuments Man"
- Russell Stover, candy manufacturer
- Alvin Straight, lawn-mower rider
- Chris Street, basketball player
- Jeff Streeter, auto racer
- Stephen Stucker, actor
- Bob Stull, football player
- Scott Swisher, legislator
- The Sullivan Brothers, combat veterans
- Billy Sunday, baseball player, evangelist
- Roderick Dhu Sutherland, politician
- Al Swearengen, Wild West saloonkeeper
- Ryan Sweeney, baseball player
- Quinn Sypniewski, football player
- Brett Szabo, basketball player

== T ==
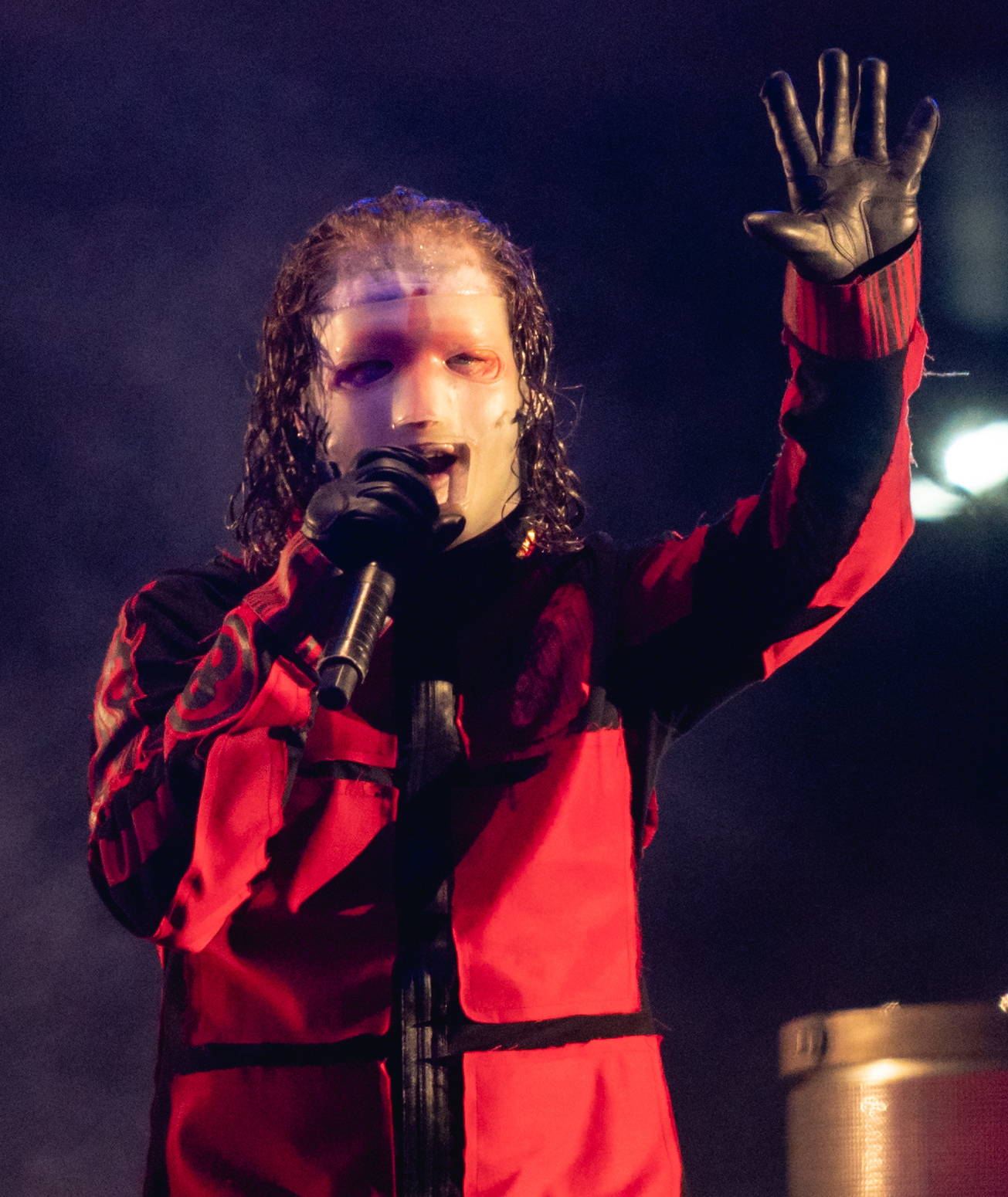
Corey Taylor

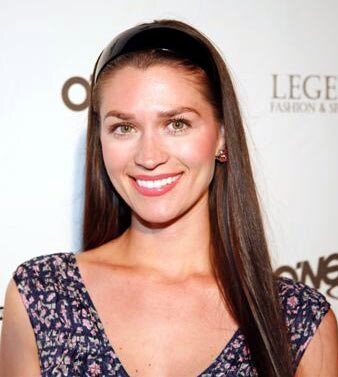
Ashley Tesoro

- Joseph Taggart, politician
- Taimah, Native American chief
- Michael Talbott, actor
- Kevin Tapani, baseball player
- Lawrie Tatum, U.S. "Indian Agent"
- Corey Taylor, musician
- Morgan Taylor, athlete
- Richard R. Taylor, surgeon general of the U.S. Army
- Robin Lord Taylor, actor
- Sara Taylor, political public-relations professional
- Ashley Tesoro, actress, singer
- Kenneth W. Thompson, academic
- Sada Thompson, actress
- William Thompson, politician
- William George Thompson, politician
- Mick Thomson, musician
- Jeannette Throckmorton, physician, quilter
- Adam Timmerman, football player
- Matt Tobin, football player
- John Tomkins, criminal
- Alice Bellvadore Sams Turner, physician, writer

== U ==
- James Ulmer, journalist
- Jarrod Uthoff, basketball player
- Sarah Utterback, actress

== V ==
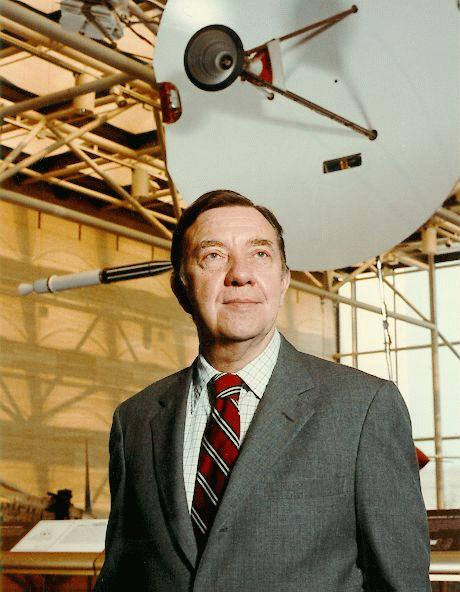
James Van Allen

- James Van Allen, scientist
- Mike Van Arsdale, MMA fighter, wrestler
- Dennis Van Roekel, labor leader
- Carl Van Vechten, writer, photographer
- Kyle Vanden Bosch, athlete
- Bob Vander Plaats, politician, activist
- Julian Vandervelde, athlete
- William Vandever, politician
- Oswald Veblen, mathematician
- Ross Verba, athlete
- Michelle Vieth, actress
- Zach Villa, actor, singer
- Phil Vischer, animator
- Krista Voda, sportscaster
- Nedra Volz, actress

== W ==
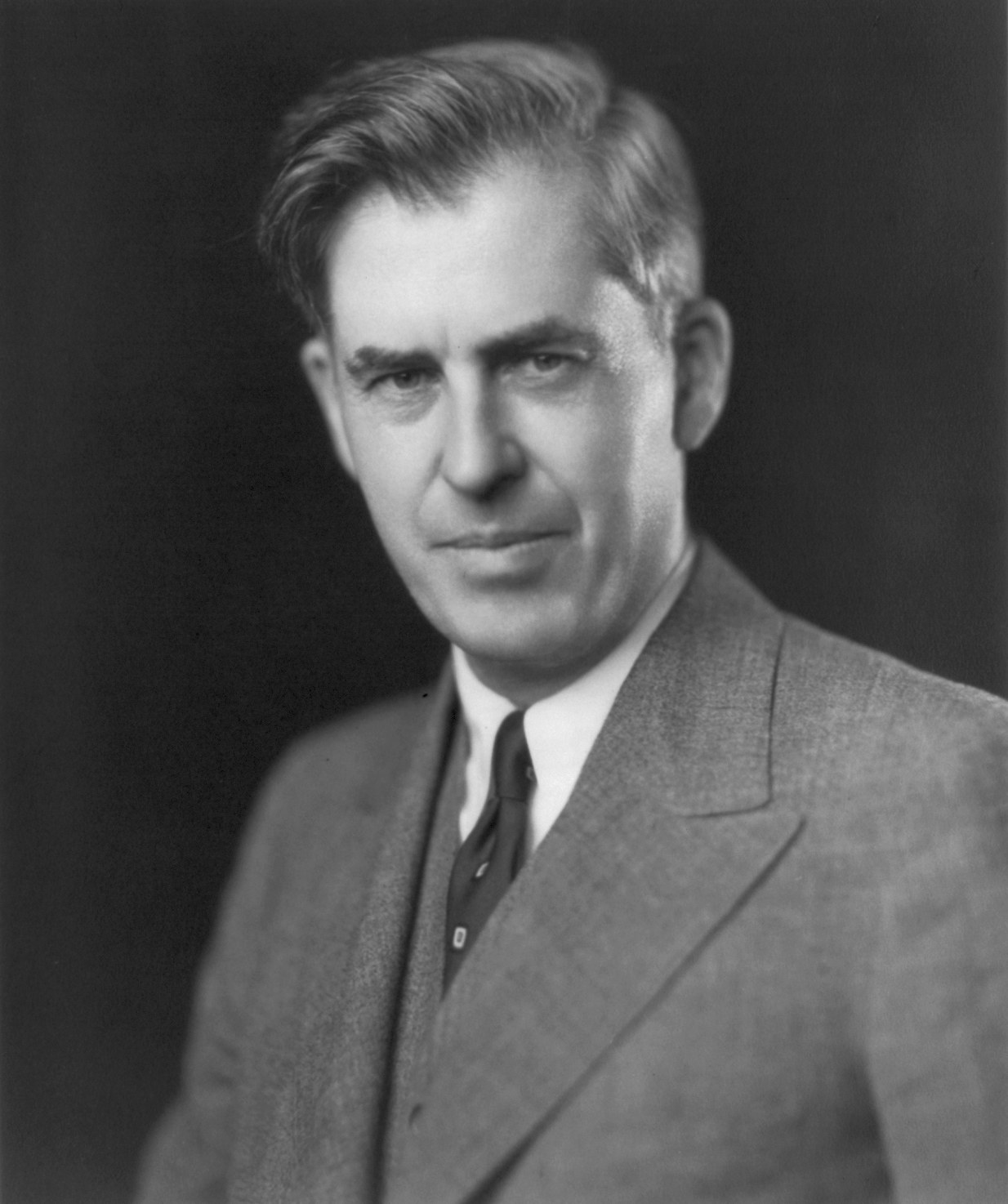
Henry A. Wallace

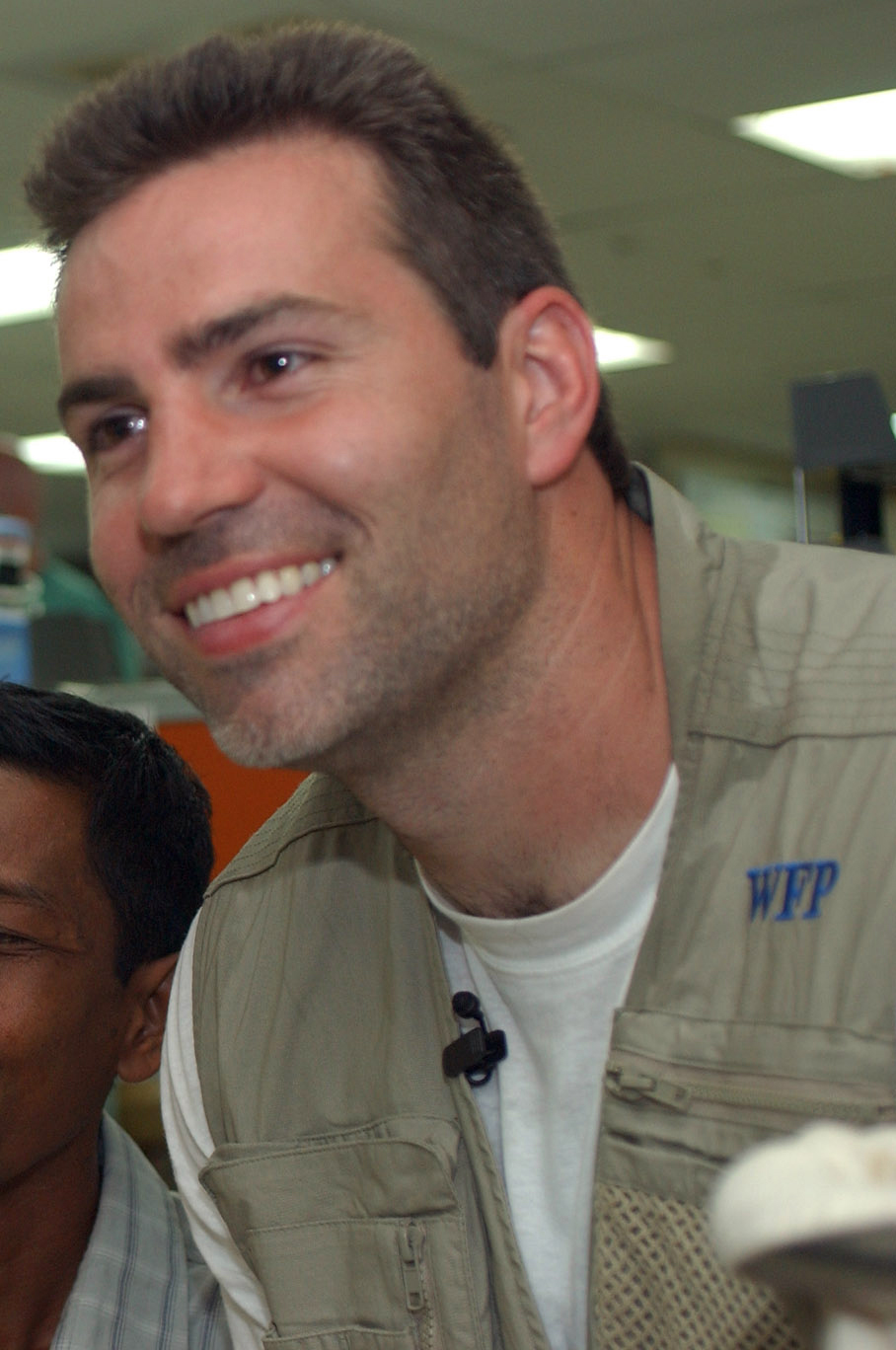
Kurt Warner

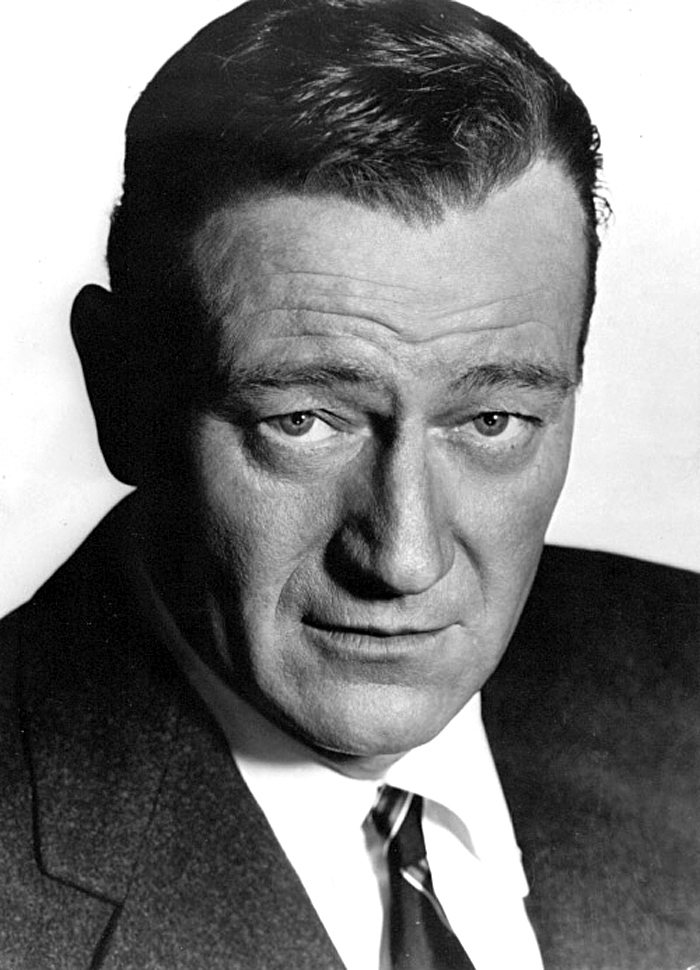
John Wayne

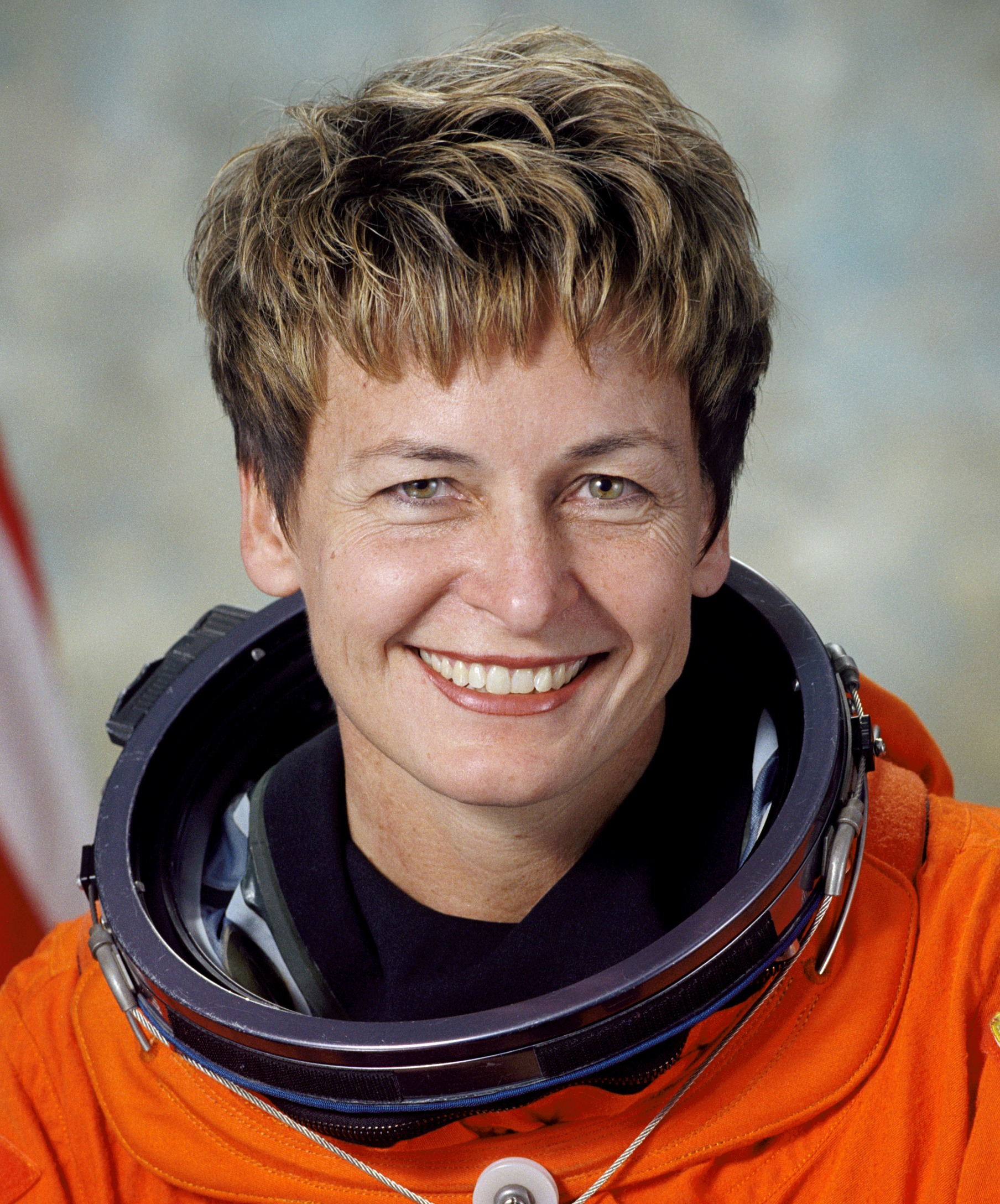
Peggy Whitson

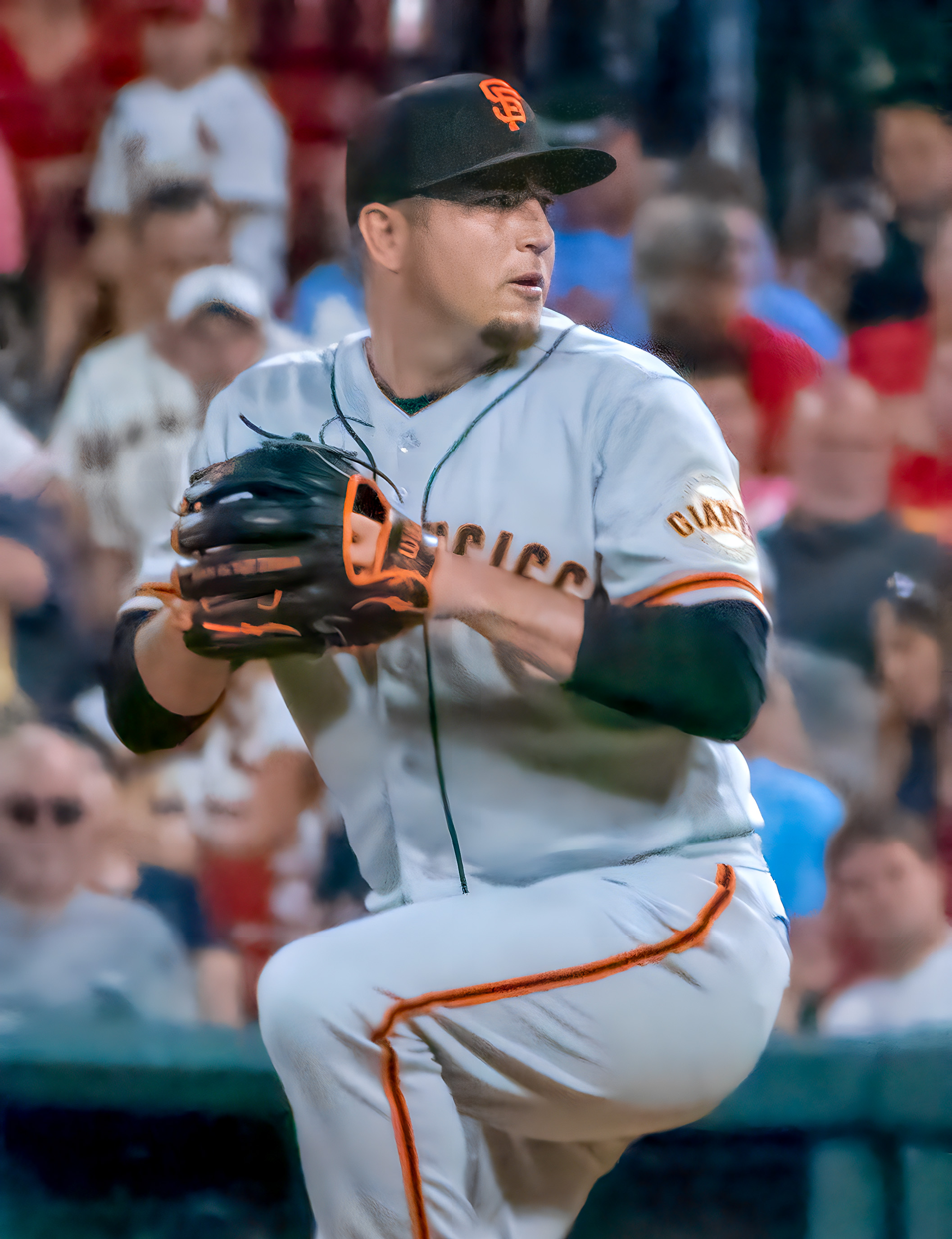
Keaton Winn

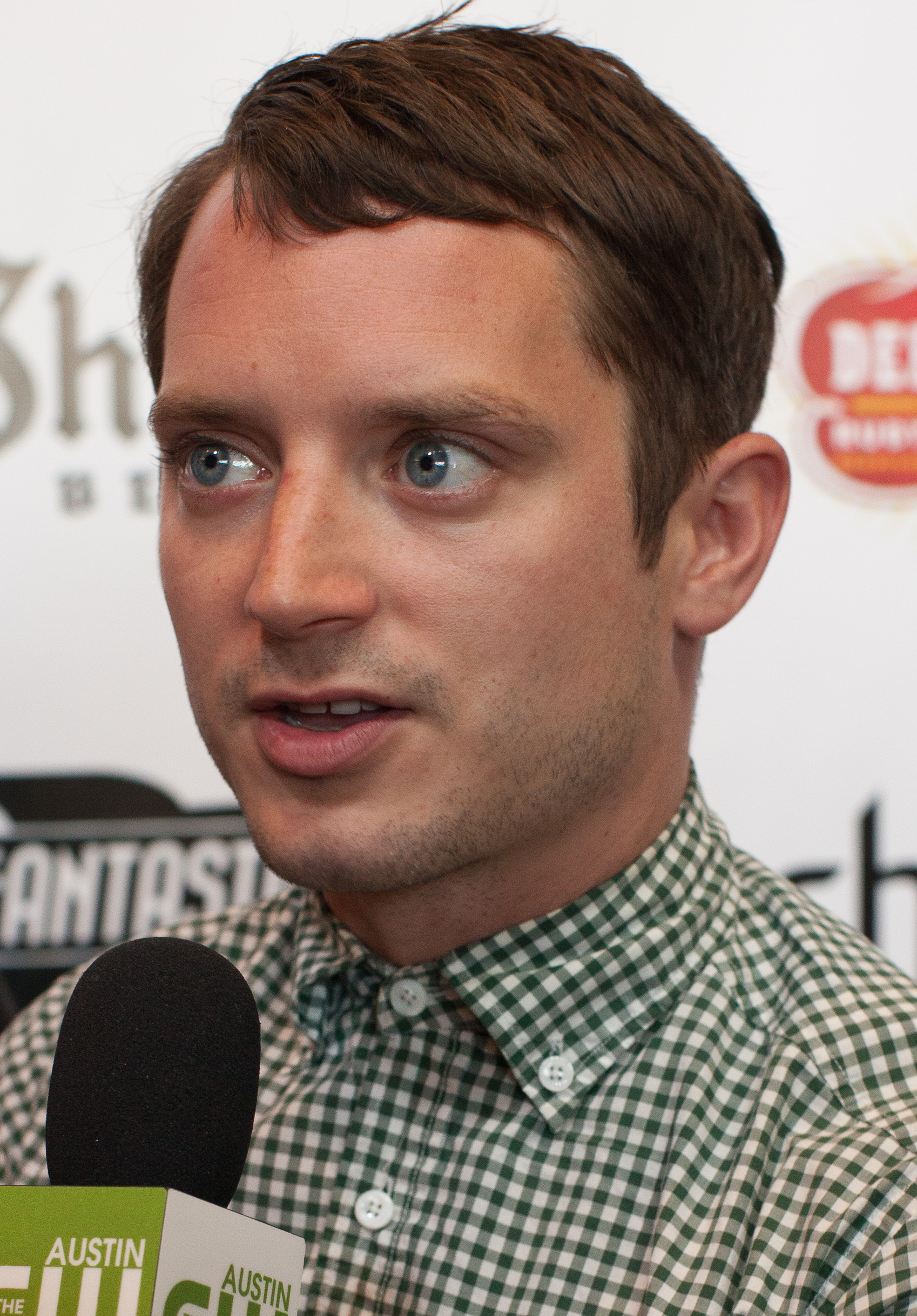
Elijah Wood

- Michael Wacha (born 1991), baseball player for the San Diego Padres
- John Henry Waddell, painter and sculptor
- Hynden Walch, actress
- Nellie Walker, sculptor
- Joseph Frazier Wall, historian
- Henry A. Wallace, politician and presidential candidate
- Marcia Wallace, actress
- Will Walling, actor
- Adam Walsh, football player and coach
- Chile Walsh, football player, coach, and executive
- Mark Walter, financier, chairman of Los Angeles Dodgers
- Rick Wanamaker, track and field athlete and basketball player
- Brian Wansink, scientist and professor
- Dedric Ward, football player, coach
- Everett Warner, painter and printmaker
- Kurt Warner (born 1971), football quarterback in the NFL
- Fitz Henry Warren, politician, Civil War general
- Kiersten Warren, actress
- Pierre Watkin, actor
- Watseka (c. 1810–1878), Native Iowan
- James F. Watson, judge
- Tony Watson (born 1985), pitcher in MLB
- John Wayne, actor
- James B. Weaver, politician
- Randy Weaver, survivalist involved in Ruby Ridge incident
- Irving Weber, businessman
- Joseph Welch, attorney
- Elmarie Wendel, actress
- Susan Werner, singer-songwriter
- Emily West, singer-songwriter
- Brooks Wheelan, actor, comedian
- Matthew Whitaker, district attorney
- John White, labor leader, president of the United Mine Workers
- Jim Whitesell, college basketball coach
- Peggy Whitson, astronaut, scientist
- Casey Wiegmann, football player in the NFL
- Doreen Wilber, archer
- Tom Wilkinson, football player
- Andy Williams, singer
- Gregory Alan Williams, actor, author
- Roy Lee Williams, labor leader
- William Appleman Williams, historian
- William Williamson, politician
- Meredith Willson, composer
- James Falconer Wilson, politician
- JoAnn Wilson, murdered wife of Canadian politician
- Mortimer Wilson, composer
- Sid Wilson, disc jockey
- Wally Wingert, actor
- Keaton Winn (born 1998), pitcher for the San Francisco Giants
- Charles E. Winter, politician
- Sidney G. Winter (born 1935), economist
- Johannes B. Wist, journalist, editor
- William P. Wolf, politician
- Elijah Wood (born 1981), actor
- Grant Wood, painter
- Joey Woody, athlete
- Hank Worden, actor
- Carleton H. Wright, U.S. Navy admiral
- Frank Wykoff, Olympic champion athlete

== Y ==
- Marshal Yanda, athlete
- Harry E. Yarnell, U.S. Navy admiral
- David Yost, actor and producer
- Ed Yost, inventor
- Jessie Young, radio host
- Nancy Youngblut, actor

== Z ==
- Luke Zeller, basketball player
- Maurice Zimm, writer for screen and radio
- Larry Zox, painter and printmaker

== See also ==
- List of Iowa Hawkeyes football honorees
- List of Iowa State University people
- List of Iowa suffragists
