= 2015 in art =

The year 2015 in art involved various significant events.

== Events ==
- February - Paul Gauguin's painting When Will You Marry? sells for $300m (£197m), reportedly to Qatar Museums, the highest known price ever paid for any work of art.
- April - The accused rapist in the Emma Sulkowicz case which inspired the art piece "Mattress Performance (Carry That Weight)" files suit in United States Federal Court in Manhattan against Columbia University, its art department chairman Jon Kessler, and the University president Lee C. Bollinger, saying through his attorneys, that he is the victim of gender discrimination and a "witch hunt".
- April 2 - Sir Peter Blake's temporary artwork Everybody Razzle Dazzle, Mersey Ferry MV Snowdrop painted in a variation of dazzle camouflage, enters service on the River Mersey in England.
- April 13 - A South African man is charged with vandalising a Johannesburg statue of Mahatma Gandhi by attempting to paint it white.
- May 1 - The new Whitney Museum of American Art facility in the Meatpacking District, Manhattan, designed by Renzo Piano, opens.
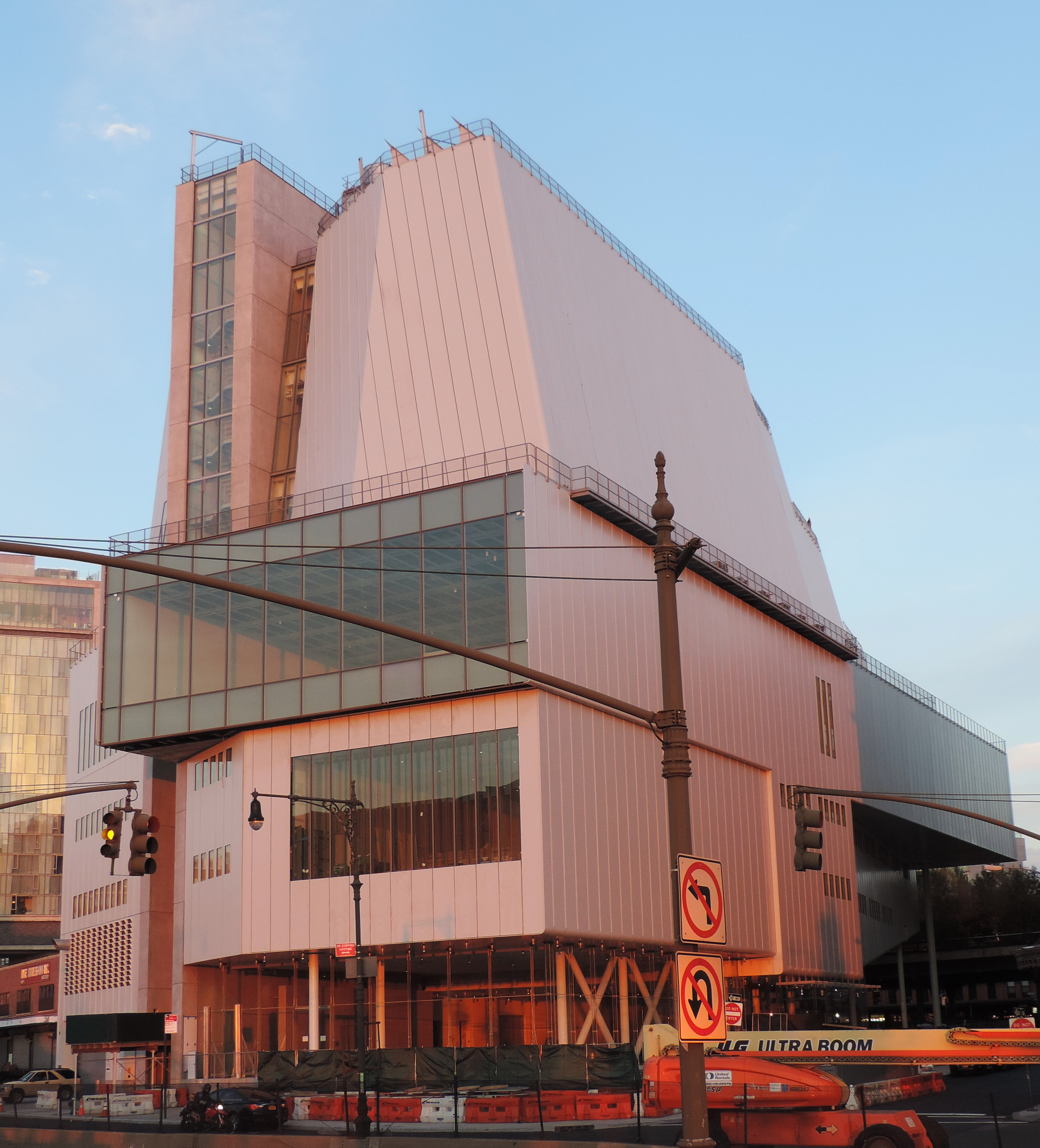
  Whitney Museum, New York
- May 11 - One canvas, "Version O", the final painting from a series of fifteen paintings and numerous drawings entitled Les Femmes d'Alger by Pablo Picasso created after the death of his friend and contemporary Henri Matisse sells for $179.4 million U.S (with fees) at Christie's in New York City thus establishing a new record for the highest price ever paid at auction for a work of art. At the same sale "Pointing Man", a work by the Swiss artist Alberto Giacometti sells for $141.3 million U.S., making it the highest price ever paid for a sculpture at auction.
- August 21 - Street artist Banksy opens Dismaland, a temporary art project in the seaside resort town of Weston-super-Mare in Somerset, England.
- September - Rembrandt's early painting Unconscious Patient (Allegory of Smell) (from The Senses series, 1624-5) emerges at an auction in New Jersey and is purchased for the Leiden Collection in New York City.
- September 20 - The Broad contemporary art museum in Downtown Los Angeles, designed by Diller Scofidio + Renfro, opens.
- October 2 - La Artcore Gallery in Los Angeles, US, presents "Excessivist Initiative", an exhibition that marks the beginning of the Excessivism movement in art.
- October 8 - Newport Street Gallery in South London, a conversion of 1913 theatrical workshops into a free public art gallery for Damien Hirst by Caruso St John architects opens.
- November 10 - The Brigadier by Lucian Freud, a portrait of Andrew Parker Bowles in his British Army uniform sells for $34.89 million US at Christie's in New York City.
- December 6 - A woman at the Art Basel Miami Beach art fair stabs another in plain sight of art goers and the incident is at first ignored as people think that it is a work of performance art.

== Exhibitions ==
- January 16 through April 26 2015 - A New Line of Thinking: Recent Sculpture by Robert Schatz at the Sheldon Museum of Art in Lincoln, Nebraska.
- January 31 until May 31 - Coney Island: Visions of an American Dreamland, 1861–2008 at the Wadsworth Atheneum in Hartford, Connecticut.
- February 6 until May 10 - Treasures from Chopin's Country. Polish Art from the 15th to 20th Century at the National Museum of China in Beijing.
- February 6 until May 3 - Tapies: From Within at the Pérez Art Museum Miami.
- February 20 until May 24 - Kehinde Wiley: A New Republic at the Brooklyn Museum in Brooklyn, New York - then traveled to the Modern Art Museum of Fort Worth in Fort Worth, Texas from September 20 until January 10, 2016 and to the Virginia Museum of Fine Arts in Richmond, Virginia from June 11. 2016 until September 5, 2016
- February 25 until May 24 - The "2015 Triennial: Surround Audience" at the New Museum in New York City.
- February 1 until May 3 - Once in a Lifetime: Piero di Cosimo at the National Gallery of Art, Washington, then travels to Galleria degli Uffizi, Florence (June 23–September 27, 2015).
- March 7 until June 7 - Björk (exhibition) at MOMA in New York City.
- March 10 until September 20- Richard Estes: Painting New York City at the Museum of Arts and Design in New York City.
- March 26 until September 13 - Water to Paper, Paint to Sky: The Art of Tyrus Wong at the Museum of Chinese in America" in New York City.
- May 1 until September 27 - America is Hard to See at the Whitney Museum of American Art in New York City.
- May 9 until September 22 - "Sean Scully: Land Sea" at the Palazzo Falier in Venice, Italy.
- May 9 until November 22 - Ursula von Rydingsvard, a collateral event of The 56th International Art Exhibition, La Biennale di Venezia, in the Giardino della Marinaressa, in Venice.
- May 17 - September 7 - "Yoko Ono: One Woman Show, 1960–1971" at MOMA in New York City.
- June 5 until August 30 - Polish Art: Enduring Spirit at the National Museum of Korea in Seoul.
- June 13 until November 8 - Art in Dialogue: Duccio Caro at the National Gallery in London.
- June 28 until October 4 - Gustave Caillebotte: The Painter's Eye at the National Gallery of Art, Washington.
- June 30 until October 4 - "Sargent: Portraits of Artists and Friends" at the Metropolitan Museum of Art in New York CIty,
- July 10 until January 24, 2016 - No Colour Bar: Black British Art in Action 1960–1990 at the Guildhall Art Gallery, City of London,
- July 18 until September 27 - Archibald, Wynne and Sulman Prizes annual exhibition at the Art Gallery of New South Wales in Sydney, Australia.
- July 31 until November 8 - Masterpieces from the Hermitage: The Legacy of Catherine the Great at the National Gallery of Victoria in Melbourne, Australia.
- August 14 until October 25 - Julia Margaret Cameron from the Victoria and Albert Museum, London, at the Art Gallery of New South Wales in Sydney, Australia.
- September 5 until October 3 - "Concrete Cuba" at the David Zwirner Gallery, London and then January 7, 2016 until February 20, 2016 at the David Zwirner Gallery, New York City.
- September 14 until February 7, 2016 - Picasso Sculpture at MOMA in New York City.
- September 18 until January 3, 2016 - Kongo: Power and Mystery at the Metropolitan Museum of Art in New York City.
- October 2 until October 29, 2016 - La Artcore gallery in Los Angeles, presented "Excessivist Initiative". The exhibition marked the beginning of the Excessivism movement.
- October 2 until January 17, 2016 - Archibald Motley: Jazz Age Modernist at the Whitney Museum of American Art in New York City.
- October 7 until January 10, 2016 - Andrea del Sarto: The Renaissance Workshop in Action at the Frick Collection in New York City.
- October 9 until January 6, 2016 - Alberto Burri: The Trauma of Painting at the Solomon R. Guggenheim Museum in New York City.
- October 18 until January 10, 2016 - "Delacroix and the Rise of Modern Art" curated by Patrick Noon and Christopher Riopelle at the Minneapolis Institute of Art in Minneapolis, Minnesota then traveled to the National Gallery in London, United Kingdom from February 17, 2016 until May 22, 2016.
- October 24 until February 14, 2016 - The Greats: masterpieces from the National Galleries of Scotland at the Art Gallery of New South Wales in Sydney, Australia.
- October 30 until February 7, 2016 - Frank Stella: A Retrospective at the Whitney Museum of American Art in New York City.
- November 5 until March 13, 2016 - Martin Wong: Human Instamatic at the Bronx Museum of Art.
- November 18 until April 3, 2016 - Procession: The Art of Norman Lewis at the Pennsylvania Academy of Fine Arts in Philadelphia, Pennsylvania, then traveled to Amon Carter Museum of American Art in Fort Worth, Texas from June 4 - August 21, 2016 and the Chicago Cultural Center in Chicago, Illinois from September 17, 2016 until January 8, 2017.
- November 19 until February 21, 2016 - Nari Ward: Sun Splashed at the Pérez Art Museum Miami.
- November 21 until February 28, 2016 - ''Christopher Hart Chambers'' at the Nassau County Museum of Art in Roslyn Harbor, New York.

== Works ==
- Atelier Van Lieshout - "Domestikator"
- Banksy – Portrait of Steve Jobs at Calais jungle.
- Alberto Burri - Il Grande Cretto, Gibellina, Sicily, Italy (work begun in 1984; completed in 2015)
- Molly Crabapple - Saints and Sinners (mural) commissioned for and displayed at the Knickerbocker Hotel in New York City.
- Andy Edwards - The Beatles Statue, Liverpool, UK.
- Rubin Eynon - Gallos at Tintagel Castle in Cornwall, England
- Dante Ferretti – Feeding the Planet, Energy for Life for Expo 2015 in Milan, Italy.
- Rowan Gillespie - Bust of Archbishop John Hughes permanently installed at the Old St. Patrick's Cathedral in New York City.
- Anthea Hamilton – Project for Door (After Gaetano Pesce)
- Jim and Christina Demetro - Stuates of Elizabeth Taylor and Richard Burton
- Robert Liberace - The Fifth Circle
- Peter Lundberg - Eye of Sauron installed on the Ossining, New York, waterfront.
- Michael Mandiberg - "Print Wikipedia"
- Cornelia Parker and collaborators – Magna Carta (An Embroidery)
- Paul Rucker - "Storm in the Time of Shelter"
- Thomas Sayre - Kerf sculptures, Portland, Oregon
- Timothy Schmalz - Golden Leaves (statue of Gordon Lightfoot) in Orillia, Ontario
- Anne Storrs - Along These Lines, Portland, Oregon
- Emma Sulkowicz – Mattress Performance (Carry That Weight) continued from 2014 at Columbia University in New York City.
- Adrián Villar Rojas, "The Most Beautiful of All Mothers" in the Sea of Marmara off the island of Büyükada and in front of the Turkish home in exile of Leon Trotsky as part of the 2015 Istanbul Biennial in Istanbul, Turkey
- Statue of Baphomet

== Awards ==
- Archibald Prize - Nigel Milsom for "Portrait of Charles Waterstreet
- Artes Mundi Prize - Theaster Gates
- Käthe Kollwitz Prize - Bernard Frize—The Venice Biennial (May 9- November 22) --
- Leone d'Oro for Lifetime Achievement: El Anatsui, Ghana
- Leone d'Oro for the Best Artist of the international exhibition: Adrian Piper, United States
- Leone d'Oro for the Best Young Artist: Im Heung-soon, South Korea
- Leone d'Oro for Best Pavilion: Armenia; Haig Aivazian, Nigol Bezjian, Anna Boghiguian, Hera Büyüktaş, Silvina Der Meguerditchian, Ayreen Anastas and Rene Gabri, Mekhitar Garabedian, Aikaterini Gegisian, Yervant Gianikian and Ricci Lucchi, Aram Jibilian, Nina Katchadourian, Melik Ohanian, Mikayel Ohanjanyan, Rosana Palazyan, Sarkis, Hrair Sarkissian, curated by Adelina Cüberyan von Fürstenberg

== Films ==
- The 100 Years Show
- The Danish Girl

== Deaths ==
- January 4 - Elisabetta Catalano, 70, Italian fine-art photographer
- January 5 - Milton Hebald, 97, American sculptor
- January 13 - Jane Wilson, 90, American painter
- January 15 - Walter Westbrook, 93, South African artist
- January 16
  - Ted Harrison, 88, British-born Canadian painter
  - Walter Peregoy, 89, American visual and animation background artist
- January 22 - Margaret Bloy Graham, 94, Canadian author and illustrator
- January 24 - Frances Lennon, 102, English painter and illustrator
- January 26 - Cleven "Goodie" Goudeau, 83, American greeting card artist
- January 27 - Arturo Carmassi, 89, Italian sculptor and painter
- January 29 - Will McBride, 84, American photographer
- January 31 - Vasco Bendini, 93, Italian painter
- February 3 - Walter Liedtke, 69, American art curator of European paintings (The Metropolitan Museum of Art)
- February 7 - John C. Whitehead, 92, American baker, civil servant and art collector
- February 12 - Tomie Ohtake, 101, Japanese-Brazilian artist
- February 15.- Mikhail Koulakov, 82, Russian painter
- February 21 - John Knapp-Fisher, 83, British painter
- February 24 - Roger Cecil, 72, Welsh painter
- March 1 - Carel Visser, 86, Dutch sculptor
- March 4 - William King, 90, American sculptor
- March 7 - Osi Rhys Osmond, 72, Welsh painter and television presenter
- March 11 - Inger Sitter, 85, Norwegian painter and graphic designer
- March 12
  - Michael Graves, 80, American architect
  - Helga Sonck-Majewski, 98, Finnish artist
- March 13 - Ismaïla Manga, 67, Senegalese painter
- March 14 - Bodys Isek Kingelez, 66 or 67, Democratic Republic of Congo sculptor
- March 17 - Kuniyoshi Kaneko, 78, Japanese painter, illustrator and photographer
- March 21 - Hans Erni, 106, Swiss painter, designer and sculptor
- March 24 - Otto Frello, 90, Danish artist and illustrator
- March 26 - Albert Irvin, 92, British artist
- March 27 - Michael Rush, American museum director (the Eli and Edythe Broad Art Museum)
- March 31 - Betty Churcher, 84, Australian arts administrator and curator, director of the National Gallery of Australia (1990–1997)
- April 2 - Paule Anglim, 90+, American gallerist
- April 5 - Sargy Mann, 77, British painter
- April 8 - Lars Tunbjörk, 59, Swedish photographer
- April 9 - Rafael Soriano, 94, Cuban painter
- April 12 - Jože Ciuha, 90, Slovenian painter
- April 15 - Judith Malina, 88, American actress, co-founder of The Living Theater
- April 16 - Giuseppe Zigaina. 91, Italian neorealist painter and author
- May 4 - Eva Aeppli, 90, Swiss artist
- May 7 - John Dixon, 86, Australian cartoonist (Air Hawk and the Flying Doctors)
- May 8 - Menashe Kadishman, 82, Israeli painter and sculptor
- May 10
  - Jack Body, 70, New Zealand composer and photographer
  - Chris Burden, 69, American artist
  - William T. Cooper, 81, Australian ornithologist and illustrator
  - Rachel Rosenthal, 88, French-born American performance artist
- May 17 - Gerald Steadman Smith, 85, Canadian artist
- May 23 - Carl Nesjar, 94, Norwegian painter and sculptor
- May 25 - Mary Ellen Mark, 75, American photographer
- June 2 - Miguel-Ángel Cárdenas, 80, Colombian-Dutch painter and illustrator
- June 12
  - Antoni Pitxot, 81, Spanish painter
  - Nek Chand Saini, 90, Indian sculptor
- June 19 - Earl Norem, 92, American painter and illustrator
- June 20 - Miriam Schapiro, 91, Canadian-born American painter, sculptor and printmaker
- June 22 - Don Featherstone, 79, American artist and inventor of the plastic pink flamingo
- July 2 - David Aronson, 91, American painter
- July 20 - Sally Gross, 81, American avant-garde choreographer, dancer
- July 24 - Ingrid Sischy, 63, South African born art critic
- August 4 - Calle Örnemark, 81, Swedish sculptor
- August 10 - Sunil Das, 76, Indian artist
- August 16 - Melva Bucksbaum, 82, American art collector, curator, patron of the arts and vice chairwoman of the Whitney Museum board of trustees
- August 28
  - David Michie, 87, French-born British painter. (death announced on this date)
  - Nelson Shanks, 77, American painter, cancer.
- September 3 - Yevgeny Ukhnalyov, 83, Russian artist, co-author of the current coat of arms of Russia
- September 6 - John Perreault, 78, American art critic
- September 12 - Salvo, 68, Italian artist
- September 15 - Cor Melchers, 61, Dutch painter
- September 17 - Stojan Batič, 90, Slovene sculptor
- September 19 - Brian Sewell, 84, British art critic
- September 25 - Carol Rama, 97, Italian painter
- September 26 - Paul Reed, 96, American painter
- October 10 - Hilla Becher, 81, German photographer
- October 15 - Bruce Mozert, 98, American photographer
- October 25 - Wojciech Fangor, 92, Polish artist
- November 3 - Judy Cassab, 95, Austrian-born Australian portrait painter
- November 4 - Laila Pullinen, 82, Finnish sculptor.
- November 7 - Pancho Guedes, 90, Portuguese architect and artist
- November 12
  - Peter McLeavey, 79, New Zealand art dealer
  - Aaron Shikler, 93, American artist
- November 25 - Eva Fuka, 88, Czech-born American photographer
- November 26 - Eldzier Cortor, 99, American artist
- December 6 - Holly Woodlawn, 69, Puerto Rican transgender actress and Warhol superstar
- December 13 - Hema Upadhyay, 43, Indian artist
- December 16 - George Earl Ortman, 89, American artist
- December 27 - Ellsworth Kelly, 92, American artist
