= Gerald Smith =

Gerald Smith may refer to:

- Gerald L. K. Smith (1898–1976), American activist and politician
- Gerald W. Smith (1929–2017), American writer
- Gerald Smith (Canadian politician) (born 1943), Canadian politician
- Gerald Lee Smith (born 1983), American rapper known as "Nekro G"
- Gerald Martin Smith (born 1955), British businessman and convicted fraudster
- Gerald Oliver Smith (1892–1974), English-born actor in the United States
- Gerald Birney Smith (1868-1929), American author
- Gerald Steadman Smith (1929–2015), Canadian artist
- Gerry Smith (born 1939), English footballer

== See also ==
- Gerald Smyth (1885–1920), British Army officer
- Jerry Smith (disambiguation)
- Gerard Smith (disambiguation)
