= Arthur's Stone =

Arthur's Stone may refer to:

- Arthur's Stone, Gower, an archeological site on the Gower Peninsula in Wales
- Arthur's Stone, Herefordshire, a Neolithic tomb in Herefordshire, England
- Arthur stone, or Artognou stone, a 6th-century inscribed stone found at Tintagel, Cornwall, England
- Arthur's Stone, Kerikeri, a monument in New Zealand
