= Jerry Smith =

Jerry Smith may refer to:

- Jerry Edwin Smith (born 1946), American federal appellate judge
- Jerry Smith (tight end) (1943–1986), American football tight end
- Jerry Smith (American football coach) (1930–2011), American football coach
- Jerry Smith (basketball, born 1941), American basketball player who played collegiately at Furman
- Jerry Smith (basketball, born 1987), American basketball player
- Jerry L. Smith (1943–2015), American lawyer and politician
- Jerry Smith (golfer) (born 1964), American professional golfer
- Jerry Smith (martial artist), former professional full-contact fighting coach
- Jerry Smith (soccer) (born 1960), American soccer coach
- Jerry Smith (Rick and Morty), a fictional character in the American animated series Rick and Morty

== See also ==
- Gerry Smyth (born 1961), Irish academic and musician
- Gerry Smith (born 1939), English footballer
- Gerald Smith (disambiguation)
- Gerard Smith (disambiguation)
- Jeremy Smith (disambiguation)
- Jeremiah Smith (disambiguation)
