= Carmassi =

Carmassi is a family name of Italian origin. It may refer to:

- Arturo Carmassi, Italian sculptor and painter
- Denny Carmassi, American drummer
- Giulio Carmassi, Italian composer and producer
- Massimo Carmassi, Italian architect
