= Jeremy Smith =

Jeremy Smith may refer to:

- Jeremy Smith (Royal Navy officer) (fl. 1660s), British sailor
- Jeremy C. Smith (born 1959), British biophysicist
- Jeremy Smith (American musician), lead vocalist and keyboardist for American band Days Difference
- Jeremy Smith (Australian musician) (fl. early 1990s), Australian musician
- Jeremy Smith (rugby league, born 1980), New Zealand rugby league footballer (Melbourne, St. George Illawarra, Cronulla-Sutherland, Newcastle)
- Jeremy Smith (rugby league, born 1981), New Zealand rugby league footballer (Parramatta, South Sydney, Salford, Wakefield Trinity)
- Jeremy Smith (cricketer) (born 1988), Tasmanian cricketer
- Jeremy Smith (ice hockey) (born 1989), American ice hockey goaltender
- Jeremy Smith (Australian footballer) (born 1973), Australian rules footballer
- Jeremy Adam Smith (born 1970), author and blogger
- Jeremy Smith (historian) (fl. 1990s–2010s)
- Jeremy Irvine (born 1990), née Jeremy Smith, actor
- Jeremy J. Smith (fl. 2000s–2010s), British philologist

== See also ==
- Jerry Smith (disambiguation)
- Jeremiah Smith (disambiguation)
