= Brian Smith (photographer) =

American portrait photographer and photojournalist

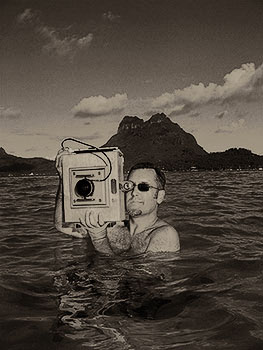
- Smith in Bora Bora, 2003
- Born: Ames, Iowa, US
- Education: University of Missouri
- Known for: Photography
- Father: Gerald W. Smith
- Awards: Pulitzer Prize; Pictures of the Year International
- Website: www.briansmith.com

Brian Smith is an American portrait photographer and photojournalist. He may be known best for portraits of actors, business leaders, politicians, and athletes that are at once stylish and telling.

== Early life and education ==
Born in Ames, Iowa, Smith got his start in photography in high school as a stringer for the Ames Tribune. He received his bachelor's degree in journalism from the University of Missouri. As a 20-year-old student there, his first magazine photograph was published in Life magazine, showing the New York Yankees manager Billy Martin crying at the funeral of his player Thurman Munson.

== Career ==
Smith's portraits of celebrities, athletes and business executives have appeared on the covers of magazines, including his photograph of Pope John Paul II, which was featured on the cover of the Newsweek Commemorative issue.

The book Art & Soul features Smith's portraits of celebrities accompanied by personal testimonials from each artist expressing their support for the importance of the arts in their lives.

Smith is President of Editorial Photographers (EP), a photography trade organization of magazine photographers and photojournalists from around the world. He has lectured students on the Business of Editorial Photography at Brooks Institute of Photography, Ohio University, Hallmark Institute and the Atlanta and Fort Lauderdale Art Institutes.

His television appearances include guest appearances on The X Factor and Fine Living Network Smith has been featured in the Photo District News Portraiture Issue, the Communication Arts Photography Annual, and Pop Photo.

== Personal life ==
He lives in Miami Beach, Florida, with his wife Fazia Ali, a fashion stylist. He is the son of Gerald W. Smith, author of the textbook Engineering Economy: Analysis of Capital Expenditures, emeritus Professor at Iowa State University in Ames.

== Awards and honors ==
Smith was a member of the Orange County Register photography staff that won the 1985 Pulitzer Prize for Spot News Photography recognizing its coverage of the 1984 Los Angeles Olympic Games. In 1988 he and Carol Guzy were finalists for their photographs of Haiti in turmoil, published by the Miami Herald.

His photograph of Greg Louganis hitting his head on the diving board at the 1988 Seoul Olympic Games won first prize in the Sports category of the 1988 World Press Photo, and was included in Photo District News as a memorable sports photograph.

== Publications ==
- Art & Soul: Stars Unite to Celebrate and Support the Arts. New York: Filipacchi, 2011. Edited by Smith and Robin Bronk. ISBN 1936297469.
- Secrets of Great Portrait Photography: Portraits of the Famous and Infamous. San Francisco: New Riders, 2013. ISBN 0321804147.
