= Gerard Smith =

Gerard Smith may refer to:

- Sir Gerard Smith (governor) (1839–1920), governor of Western Australia
- Gerard C. Smith (1914–1994), U.S. diplomat
- Gerard Smith (Gaelic footballer) (born 1994), Gaelic footballer
- Gerard Smith (musician) (1974–2011), musician with TV on the Radio
- Gerard Corley Smith (1909–1997), environmentalist
- Gerard Edwards Smith (1804–1881), Church of England cleric and botanist

== See also ==
- Gerard Smyth (born 1951), Irish poet
- Jerry Smith (disambiguation)
- Gerald Smith (disambiguation)
