= Artognou stone =

Latin inscription found in Tintagel Castle

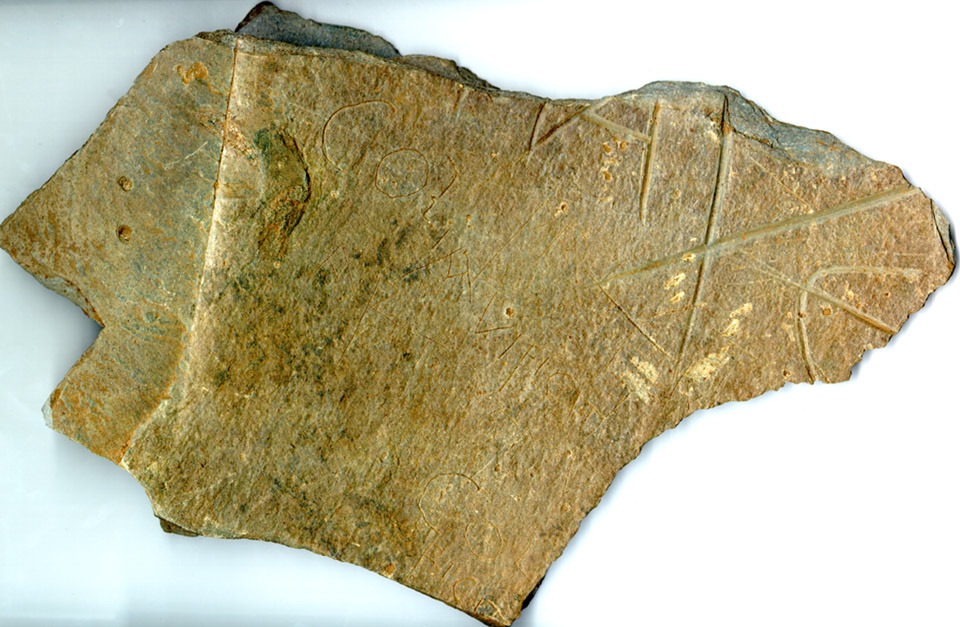
The Artognou stone

A copy on display in Tintagel

The Artognou stone, sometimes referred to as the Arthur stone, is an archaeological artefact uncovered in Cornwall in the United Kingdom. It was discovered in 1998 in securely dated sixth-century contexts among the ruins at Tintagel Castle in Cornwall, a secular, high status settlement of sub-Roman Britain. It appears to have originally been a practice dedication stone for some building or other public structure, but it was broken in two and re-used as part of a drain when the original structure was destroyed. Upon its discovery the stone achieved some notoriety due to the suggestion that "Artognou" was connected to the legendary King Arthur, though scholars such as John Koch have criticised the evidence for this connection. The stone is on display at the Royal Cornwall Museum.

== Archaeological description ==
The dating of the stone has been arrived at by two methods: first, the stone came from a securely stratified context in association with imported pottery of known types dating to the fifth/sixth centuries; second, forms of certain letters noted on the slate appear in British inscribed stones from Scotland to Cornwall post-500 and are certainly known elsewhere from 6th century north Cornwall (part of the kingdom of Dumnonia).

At the top right-hand corner of the fragment is a deeply cut motif consisting (as visible) of a letter A and another incomplete character on either side of a large diagonal cross; the whole may represent a common Christian symbol, a Christogram—the Greek alphabet letters Alpha and Omega flanking a large Greek letter Chi (written like a Roman X), the initial of Christos (Christ). Below this and to the left, but overlapping it slightly, is a smaller, more lightly incised inscription in Latin, reading: PATERN[--] COLI AVI FICIT ARTOGNOU. This seems to have been repeated lower down and to the right; only the letters COL[.] and FICIT, on two lines, can be seen on the fragment. This repetition, the overlap with the Christogram and the shallow carving (scratching would be a more accurate description) all suggest that this was not a formal inscription but an example of graffiti.

The inscription has been translated by the Celtic Inscribed Stones Project as "Artognou descendant of Patern[us] Colus made (this). Colus made (this)."

The name Artognou means "Bear Knowing", from the Brittonic root *arto "bear" plus *gnāwo- "to know", and is cognate with the Old Breton name Arthnou and Welsh Arthneu.

Also found in the sixth-century fort at Tintagel were numerous remains of expensive pottery, glasswork, and coins from Visigothic Spain and the Byzantine Empire (when excavated in the 1930s by C. A. Ralegh Radford).

== Arthurian controversy ==
After its discovery the stone was advanced in popular news media as possible evidence for the historical basis for the legendary King Arthur, with the name Artognou proposed as a variant of Arthur, and was referred to as the "Arthur stone". The stone's dating fits the general timeframe usually given for an "historical Arthur" and, according to a tradition first recorded by Geoffrey of Monmouth, Arthur was conceived at Tintagel Castle. However, the Celticist John Koch and other scholars have rejected this idea, arguing against the connection between the names and saying there is no reason to suspect an association with a historical Arthur. Koch justifies this by pointing out that the name Artognou means "bear-knowledge", whereas he suggests the name Arthur is more likely derived from the Latin "Artorius".
