= Jeremiah Smith =

Jeremiah Smith may refer to:

- Jeremiah Smith (Royal Navy officer) (died 1675), English naval officer
- Jeremiah Smith (clergyman) (died 1723), English author and theologian
- Jeremiah Smith (lawyer) (1759–1842), American jurist and state governor
- Jeremiah Smith (Manchester Grammar School) (1771–1854), English cleric and headmaster
- Jeremiah Smith (American football) (born 2005), American wide receiver with the Ohio State Buckeyes
- Jeremiah Smith, fictional character in The X-Files

== See also ==
- Jeremiah Smith Boies De Veber (1830–1908), Canadian politician and businessman
- Jeremiah Smith Grange #161, listed in the New Hampshire State Register of Historic Places
- Jerry Smith (disambiguation)
