= Jerry Smith (martial artist) =

American karateka

Jerry Smith is a former professional full-contact fighting coach, as well as co-founder of the Black Karate Federation (BKF) and founder of the Five-Level Method/Shorin-Ju Kenpo.

In addition to being a three-time international champion (Wall 2003, p. 112-113) in semi-contact karate, and a former trainer of world-rated full-contact fighters, Senior Grandmaster Jerry Smith is one of the original founders of the Black Karate Federation (BKF) in Los Angeles, California. (Corcoran and Farkas 1993, p. 379)

In the late 1960s, a group of young martial art enthusiasts including Jerry Smith came together to train and exchange techniques. These included Jerry Smith, Cliff Stewart , Ron Chapel , Steve Sanders , Donnie Williams, Karl Armelin and Curtis Pulliam.

"Smith recalls the group: 'We were the right mix of people at the right time' he says. 'We created a great and unbeatable mix of techniques.' At a follow-up meeting, several names for an organization were suggested. Jerry Smith, whose background was in graphic design, created a few logos for the group containing the initials "BKF", which stood for the Black Karate Federation. During the meeting, several logo designs were introduced to the group. The organizational structure of the BKF formed with Steve Sanders, the most prominent and visible member of the group. Therefore, he was unanimously selected to be the organization's first president. Jerry Smith became the first vice-president, Cliff Stewart the secretary, Ron Chapel the technical historian and Karl Armelin was treasurer. From this core group, which included Donnie Williams and Curtis Pulliam, the Black Karate Federation was officially founded." (Muhammad and Williams 2002, p. 51-53)

The first official BKF School opened in late 1971 at 10302 South Western Avenue in Los Angeles. Known as "The 103rd Street School", it was the home of the original students of the BKF. Martial arts champions such as Joe Lewis (see Joe Lewis (martial artist)), Cecil Peoples and Benny Urquidez (see Benny Urquidez) often visited the school to train. Lewis would come there to prepare for his tournament battles. In the early 1970s, Jerry captained the BKF team that won the International Karate Championships three times. (Wall 2003, p. 112-113)

"The 103rd Street School achieved notoriety as the location chosen to film a portion of the immortal martial arts films, "Enter the Dragon" starring Bruce Lee. Released by Warner Bros. Studios in 1973, the film contains a scene in which Jim Kelly ("Williams") goes into the karate school to say good-bye to his instructor (Steve Sanders) and the assistant instructor (Donnie Williams). In the "Enter the Dragon" scene, BKF co-founder Jerry Smith, as well as several BKF students can be identified. As fate would have it, those few seconds of exposure in "Enter the Dragon" has cemented the continuing legacy of the BKF because of Bruce Lee and the global impact that the film continues to have." (Muhammad and Williams 2002, p. 57)

In 1973, Jerry Smith, a commercial artist, who was a black belt and a prodigy of World Heavyweight Champion Joe Lewis, was hired as an illustrator at Black Belt Magazine.

In 1974, Jerry was an active tournament official and one of five individuals chosen by fighters around the U.S. to be a referee at Mike Stone's East vs. West Coast Team Championships in Long Beach.

In May 1975, an article called "The New Fighters Stable" was written for Karate Illustrated Magazine. The article stated that Jerry Smith created a training style that was unique.

Jerry has been featured in numerous periodicals on the martial arts, including "Black Belt", "Inside Kung-Fu", "Professional Karate", "Karate Illustrated" and "Fighting Stars". He has also been included in several books on the martial arts, such as "The Original Martial Arts Encyclopedia-Traditions, History, Pioneers" (c) 1993 by John Corcoran & Emil Farkas and "The Ultimate Martial Arts Q&A Book" (c) 2001 by John Corcoran and John Graden. Jerry was most notably featured in the directory of martial art masters: "Who's Who in the Martial Arts" (c) 2003 by Bob Wall. This book, in its second printing, features the top 250 martial artists for the last 3 decades based on their world class fighting abilities and their positive contributions to the martial arts. Jerry was also in several TV specials, including ABC's "I am somebody" and NBC's 13-week series called "Secrets of the Martial Arts" starring John Saxton and co-hosted by Jerry.

During his lengthy martial arts career, Jerry Smith trained many top champion full-contact fighters as well as a long list of celebrity students such as film stars Gloria Hendry and Bernie Casey, pro basketball stars Sidney Wicks and Curtis Rowe and pro footballer Bob Geddes. Jerry has also performed personal security work for Smokey Robinson, Stevie Wonder, Diana Ross, The Temptations, Helen Reddy and Beatle Ringo Starr. (Wall 2003, p. 112)

The regional and world-rated fighters who were with Jerry Smith during his professional training career included: "Big" John Henderson, Grandmaster Kraiguar Smith, John Townes, Ernest "Madman" Russell, Samuel Pace, Gary "Rabbit" Goodman, KC "The Blitz" Jones, James Honest, Jim Echellac, Adam Keels Jr. and Don Parish. Along with Jerry Smith, these men defeated several hall of fame fighters including Bill "Superfoot" Wallace.

In the late 1980s, Jerry Smith founded a martial art training system called "The Five-Level Method", based on his decades of experience as a martial artist. Jerry formed his training system around what he learned during his own fighting career and his many years of training professional fighters in the 1970s and 1980s. As the Senior Grandmaster of this style, Jerry continues today to train the next generation of students in the martial arts in Sunnyvale, California.

The concepts and principles in The Five-Level Method were born from Jerry's need to develop a template that assessed a professional athlete's abilities in a combative sport, and then could be used to train those athletes to be professional fighters. Jerry wanted to teach young fighters about fighting principles and methods, in order to give them a competitive advantage over their opponents without sacrificing safety.

The Five-Level Method was also originally known as "Shorin-Do Kenpo". That name was based on Jerry's own formal training in Shorin-Ryu, Judo and Kenpo. Jerry later changed that name to "Shorin-Ju Kenpo" to give equal weight to his training in Jujitsu.

Jerry Smith attained black belts in Shorin-Ryu under Jun Kina in Okinawa, American Kenpo in the Tracy system, and Jujitsu under John Chambers, along with a brown belt in judo. These rankings provided the technical foundation for Shorin-Ju Kenpo. He also gained practical experience through years of competition and personal training with martial artist Joe Lewis, which informed many of the system's principles.

Shorin-Ju Kenpo teaches fighting principles as well as five levels of preparing for self-defense: physical, technical, mechanical, psychological, and academic. Physical is about nutrition and conditioning; Technical is about the specific way a technique is performed; Mechanical is about how a technique is executed; Psychological is about your mindset when defending yourself; Academic is about why techniques are valid.

Shorin-Ju Kenpo uses a combination of sets to build coordination and mechanical proficiency, techniques to provide practical self-defense options and forms to train students on using strikes, blocks, kicks and techniques from any angle.

Credo of the Five-Level Method/Shorin-Ju Kenpo: "The ultimate goal of The Five-Level Method© is neither victory nor defeat, but the perfection of ones character."

Required Forms, Sets and Techniques

Square Blocking Set (Orange)

Punching Set (Orange)

Kicking Set (Orange)

Moving Set (Orange)

Long Blocking Set (Purple)

Stance Set (Purple)

Hidden Set (Purple-Blue)

Empty Hand Set (Blue)

Advanced Striking Set (Green)

Advanced Blocking Set (Green)

Check Set (Green)

2-man Set (Brown-Black)

2-man Set, moving (Black)

Short Form 1 (Green-Brown)

Long Form 1 (Green-Brown)

Long Form 2 – part 1 (technique names only) - Brown - Hidden Hammers - Folding Wings - Escaping Blades - Sweeping the Mace - Circling Hammers - Snapping the Twig - Crash of the Eagles - Parting Wings - Trapping Wings - Folding Fans

Long Form 2 – part 2 (technique names only) - Brown - Seven Swords - Dance of Death - Kimono Grab - Twin Kimono Grab - Full Nelson - Bear Hug - Rear choke defense - Overhand knife defense - Thrust knife defense

Advanced Techniques - Attacking the Ram - Flashing Daggers - Thundering Hammers - Circling Winds - Smashing Hammers - Sweeping Fangs - Twisting the Twig - Weaving Ridges - Hooking Hammers - Circling Branches

Weapons Set - user defined (Brown-Black)

Belt Rankings and Approximate Timing Guidelines

White to Orange – approximately 3 months

Orange to Purple – approximately 3 months

Purple to Blue – approximately 3 months

Blue to Green – approximately 6 months

Green to Brown – approximately 9 months

Brown to 1st-degree Black – approximately 12 months

1st-degree Black (1st Dan) to 2nd-degree Black and beyond – dependent upon skills and discipline of individual students

Notable Instructors and students

(Sorted by rank and then alphabetically by name)

Temple, Robert (10th Dan)

Jones, KC (7th Dan)

Dinu, Marius (7th Dan)

Avila, Aristeo "Caruso" (5th Dan)

Rabinovich, Felix (4th Dan)

Anderson, Ken (3rd Dan)

Kirschbaum, Rene (3rd Dan)

Halpin, Sean (2nd Dan)

Keels, Adam "Junior" (2nd Dan)

Neeley, Brian (2nd Dan)

August, Sara (1st Dan)

Elias, Tom (1st Dan)

Garlo, Brian (1st Dan)

Heimbaugh, Alan (1st Dan)

Marroquin, Adrian (1st Dan)

McKiernan, Sean (1st Dan)

Tran, Brian (1st Dan)
