= Jeremiah Smith (Manchester Grammar School) =

English cleric (1771–1854)

Jeremiah Smith (1771–1854) was an English cleric, known for his time as High Master of Manchester Grammar School.

== Life ==
The son of Jeremiah and Ann Smith, he was born at Brewood, Staffordshire, on 22 July 1771, and was educated under Dr. George Croft at Brewood school. He entered Hertford College, Oxford, in 1790, and graduated B.A. in 1794, M.A. in 1797, B.D. in 1810, and D.D. in 1811.

Smith was ordained in 1794 to the curacy of Edgbaston, Birmingham, which he soon exchanged for that of St. Mary's, Moseley. He was also assistant, and then second master, in King Edward's School, Birmingham; and on 6 May 1807 was appointed High Master of Manchester Grammar School, a position he held for thirty years.

While at Manchester, Smith held successively the curacies of St. Mark's, Cheetham Hill, St. George's, Carrington, and Sacred Trinity, Salford, and the incumbency of St. Peter's, Manchester (1813–25), and the rectory of St. Ann's in the same town (1822–1837). He also held the small vicarage of Great Wilbraham, near Cambridge, from 1832 to 1847, and was from 1824 one of the four "king's preachers" for Lancashire, a sinecure office which was abolished in 1845.

Smith died at Brewood on 21 December 1854. His sole publication was a sermon preached before the North Worcester volunteers in 1805. He was a Tory belonging to the Manchester Pitt Club, an opponent of Catholic emancipation and the Great Reform Bill.

== Family ==
Smith married, at King's Norton, Worcestershire, on 27 July 1811, Felicia, daughter of William Anderton of Moseley Wake Green. They had eight children, including:

- Jeremiah Finch Smith (1815–1895), the eldest son, rector of Aldridge, Staffordshire, from 1849, rural dean of Walsall from 1862, and prebendary of Lichfield Cathedral. He published sermons and tracts, and edited Admission Register of the Manchester School, 3 vols., 1866–1874, and Notes on the Parish of Aldridge, Staffordshire, 1884–9, 2 pts.
- James Hicks Smith (1822–1881), third son, barrister-at-law, author of: 1. Brewood, a Résumé, Historical and Topographical, 1867. 2. Reminiscences of Thirty Years, by an Hereditary High Churchman, 1868. 3. Brewood Church, the Tombs of the Giffards, 1870. 4. The Parish in History, and in Church and State, 1871. 5. Collegiate and other Ancient Manchester, 1877.
- Isaac Gregory Smith (b. 1827), fourth son, prebendary of Hereford Cathedral
- John George Smith (b. 1829), fifth son, barrister-at-law.
