= Ralegh Radford =

British archaeologist (1900–1998)

Ralegh Radford OBE FSA
- Portrait by Walter Bird, 1959
- Born: Courtenay Arthur Ralegh Radford; 7 November 1900; Hillingdon, Greater London, England
- Died: 27 December 1998 (aged 98)
- Education: Exeter College, Oxford (MA)
- Occupations: Archaeologist; historian

Courtenay Arthur Ralegh Radford (7 November 1900 – 27 December 1998) was an English archaeologist and historian who pioneered the exploration of the Dark Ages of Britain and popularised his findings in many official guides and surveys for the Office of Works. His scholarly work appeared in articles in the major British journals, such as Medieval Archaeology or the Proceedings of the British Academy and in the various Transactions of archaeological societies.

== Biography ==
Courtenay Arthur Ralegh Radford was born on 7 November 1900 at the Cedar House, Hillingdon, the only son of Arthur Lock Radford, FSA (1862–1925), an antiquary, and his second wife, Ada Minnie Hemyng Bruton, daughter of John Bruton, of Clifton. Radford's sister, Evelyn Hilda Mary, married Sir Francis D'Arcy Cooper, 1st Baronet. Radford received his M.A. from Exeter College, Oxford, where he read modern history. He was involved with the excavations at Whitby Abbey, North Riding of Yorkshire, in the early 1920s. In 1929 he was appointed Inspector of Ancient Monuments for his chosen territory, Wales and Monmouthshire, entrusted with preliminary surveys of numerous sites.

In the 1930s he excavated, and undertook a partial restoration of, The Hurlers, a group of three stone circles at St Cleer, Cornwall. In 1935 he excavated the Roman villa site at Ditchley, Oxfordshire.

He travelled in Central Europe and the Balkans and held scholarships at the British School at Athens and the British School at Rome. He was appointed Director of the British School at Rome in 1936; when the school was closed at the outbreak of World War II he returned to take up war work. He was awarded the OBE in 1947.

He then resumed his archaeological work, and was secretary of the Royal Commission on the Ancient and Historical Monuments of Wales and Monmouthshire between 1946 and 1948. His specialisation was in the early medieval period, with particular interests in the Arthurian sites of Glastonbury and Tintagel, which resulted in his classic survey, Arthurian Sites in the West (1975). The volume was occasioned by a conference and was intended to present the hard archæological and literary evidence for the traditional associations; it is still in print in a revised and enlarged edition.

His pioneer excavations at Tintagel in the 1930s have come under modern criticism, partly because the site documentation was slight, by modern standards. Radford, influenced by the historian Henry Jenner, led a considerable interpretative shift when he suggested that Tintagel was in fact a Celtic monastery and not an "Arthurian" site. In the mid-1980s a fire on Tintagel Island led to considerable erosion of the topsoil, and many more building foundations than were recorded by Radford could be seen.

His excavations at Glastonbury were undertaken in the 1960s.

In 1972 he received the gold medal of the Society of Antiquaries of London, of which he was a Fellow; he held many honorific posts, at various times President of the Prehistoric Society, Royal Archaeological Institute, Society for Medieval Archaeology and the Devonshire Association (in 1947). He was appointed Devon Local Secretary of the Society of Antiquaries of London in May 1929, and was resident at Bradninch Manor, Devon, at this time. He was also elected as a Bard of the Gorsedd of Cornwall in 1937.

He retired to Uffculme near Cullompton, Devon. For his ninetieth birthday a festschrift was produced in his honour, The Archaeology and History of Glastonbury Abbey: Essays in Honour of the Ninetieth Birthday of C.A. Ralegh Radford (1990).

Radford died on 27 December 1998, and bequeathed his private library and his papers to the University of Exeter.

Some other official site guides by Radford:

- Radford, Courtenay Arthur Ralegh (1959). The Early Christian and Norse Settlements at Birsay, Orkney. Edinburgh: Her Majesty's Stationery Office (HMSO).
- Glastonbury Abbey the Isle of Avalon (also The pictorial history of Glastonbury Abbey)
- Tintagel Castle
- Tretower Court, Breconshire
- Valle Crucis Abbey, Clwyd: Abaty Glyn y Groes
