= Gallos (sculpture) =

Sculpture in Tintagel, Cornwall

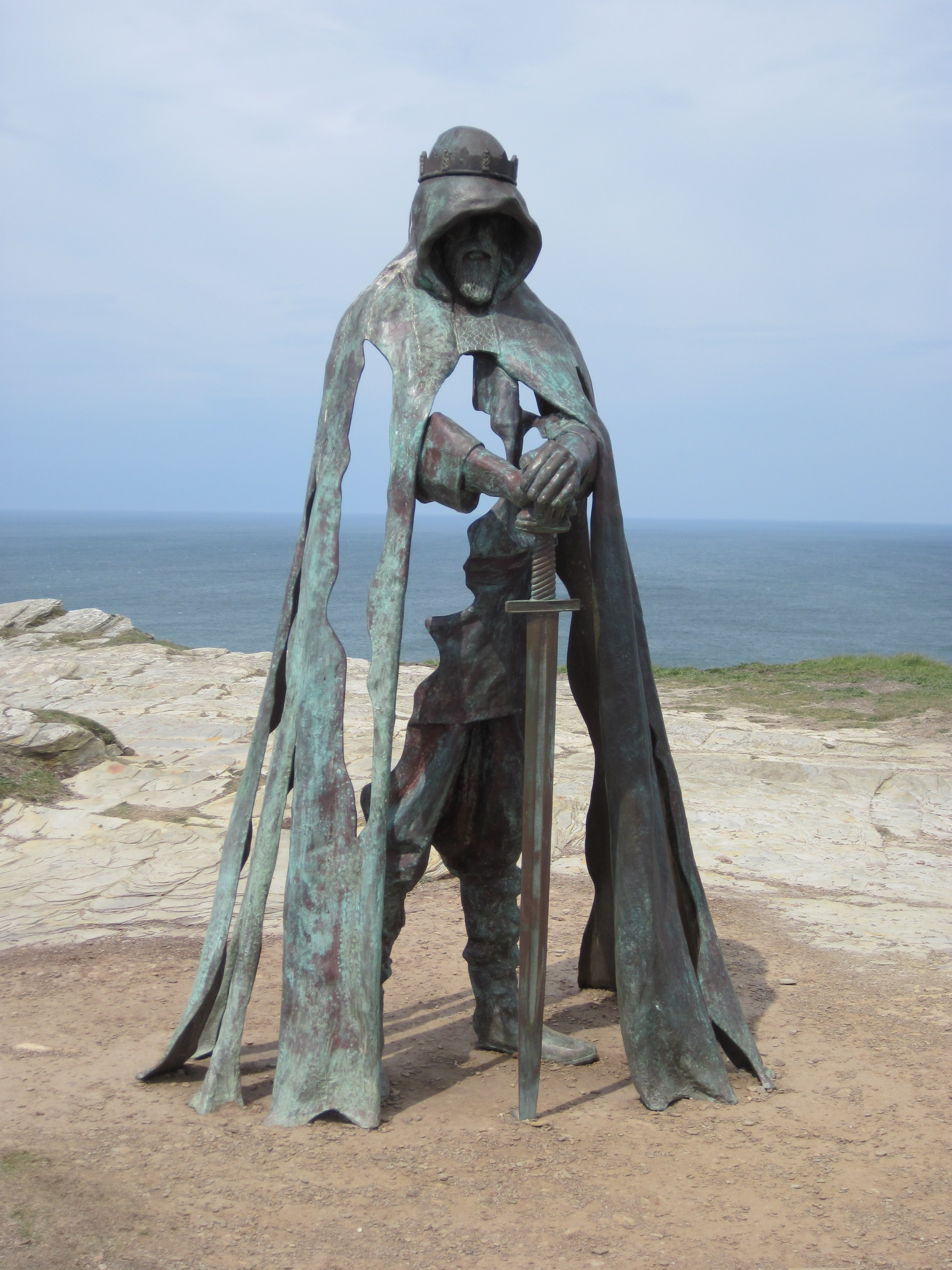
- The sculpture in 2016
- Interactive map of Gallos
- Location: Tintagel Castle
- Coordinates: 50°40′07.6″N 4°45′48.8″W
- Designer: Rubin Eynon
- Material: Bronze
- Height: 8 ft (2.4 m)
- Beginning date: 2015
- Opening date: 29 April 2016; 10 years ago
- Website: Website

Gallos is an 8-foot-tall (2.4 m) bronze sculpture by Rubin Eynon located at Tintagel Castle, a medieval fortification on the peninsula of Tintagel Island adjacent to the village of Tintagel (Trevena), North Cornwall, in the United Kingdom. It is a representation of a ghostly male figure wearing a crown and holding a sword. It is popularly called the "King Arthur statue", but the site's owner English Heritage states that it is not meant to represent a single person and reflects the general history of the site, which is likely to have been a summer residence for the kings of Dumnonia.

== Background ==
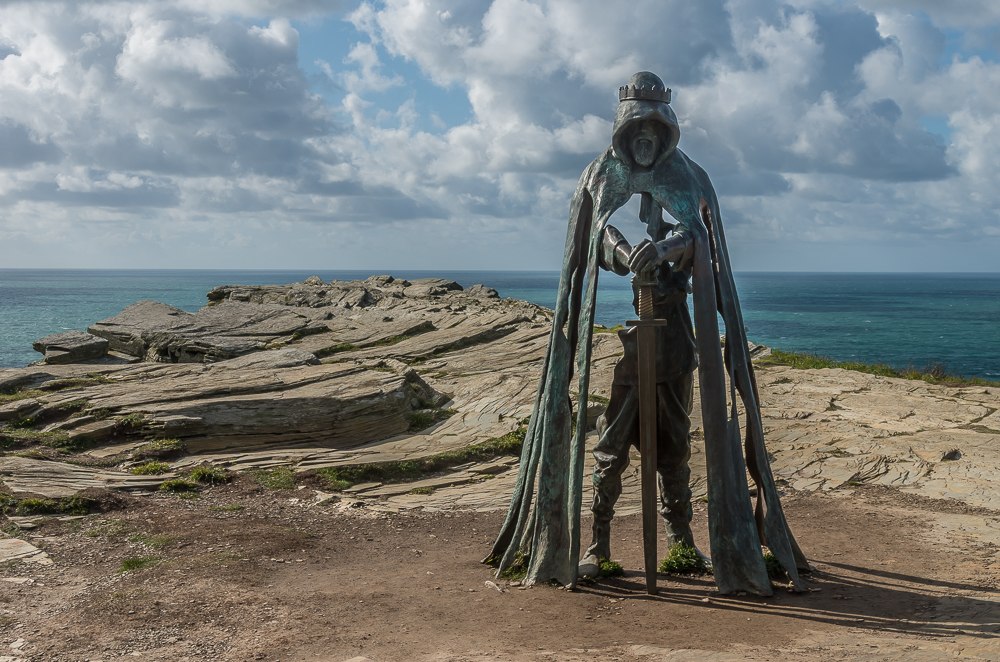
Wider view of the sculpture

Tintagel Castle is sited on the north coast of Cornwall, and is operated by English Heritage. The writings of Geoffrey of Monmouth in the 12th century associated the castle with the King Arthur legend, placing it as the home of Arthur's mother Igraine. The castle itself was constructed by Richard, Earl of Cornwall in the 1230s; inspired by the association with Arthur, he had the castle styled to appear older. It was expanded in the Victorian era.

== Sculpture ==
Gallos was commissioned by English Heritage from the sculptor Rubin Eynon, It took six months to design, sculpt and cast. Gallos portrays a figure 8 ft (2.4 m) tall in a cloak, resting on a sword and wearing a crown. The figure at Tintagel Castle is only partly rendered, with open gaps left in the sculpture through which the viewer can see the landscape beyond, giving a spectral appearance.

The sculpture has become a popular attraction at the castle site. The statue has been popularly associated with Arthur and has commonly become known as the "King Arthur Statue". However, English Heritage states that it is not a depiction of a single person, and is inspired by the likely use of the site as a summer residence for the kings of the sub-Roman state of Dumnonia as well as the Arthurian legend. They prefer that the viewer makes their own interpretation of the work and consider that the sculpture may represent something more than a human. The name "Gallos" is Cornish for "power".

== Location and installation ==
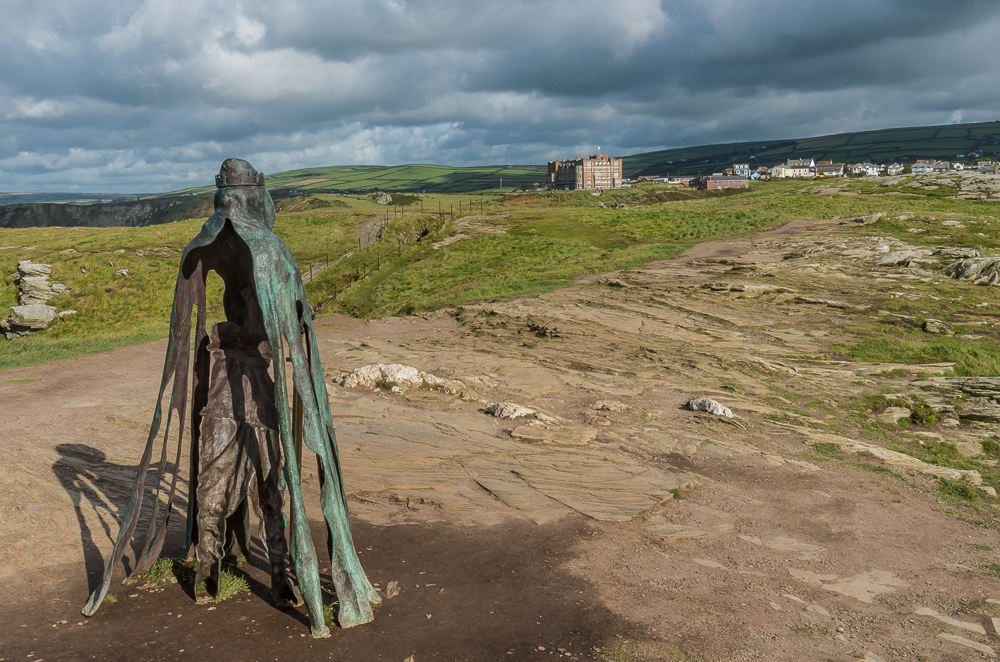
Rear of the sculpture

The statue is located above cliffs on the Atlantic coast-side of the castle. The site is only accessible from the mainland by hundreds of steps and the statue was positioned by helicopter. It was unveiled on 29 April 2016, ahead of the bank holiday weekend.

The sculpture was installed by English Heritage as part of a new visitor experience on the site. An earlier sculpture, a rock carving depicting Merlin, had been criticised by Cornish nationalists and historians for "Disneyfication" of the history of the site, and Gallos raised similar questions.

The scheme also saw the installation of a stone compass pointing to other locations across the British Isles associated with the Arthurian legends, and stepping stones in the castle garden telling the story of Tristan and Iseult. A number of information panels were also installed, telling the history of the castle site. The materials used in the new development – bronze, Delabole slate and other stone – are inspired by Tintagel's industrial history.
