= Ismaïla Manga =

Senegalese artist (1957–2015)

- Born: August 8, 1957; Kamoya, Senegal
- Died: March 13, 2015 (aged 57); Dakar, Senegal
- Education: École Nationale des Beaux-Arts, Senegal (graduated 1982); École internationale du design de Montréal
- Style: Painting
- Movement: Contemporary Senegalese art

Ismaïla Manga (August 8, 1957 – March 13, 2015) was a Senegalese Jola painter.

Born in Kamoya, he studied at the Senegal's national fine arts academy between 1977 and 1982. He lived for 13 years in Montreal (Quebec).

He lived in the Village des Arts de Dakar until he died on March 13, 2015. He had a son, Wesley (aka. Lamin) Manga.

== Education ==
In 1982, Ismaila graduated from Senegal’s Ecole Nationale des Beaux Arts. He also attended Ecole international du design de Montréal where he spent thirteen years before returning to Africa.

== Bibliography ==
- (in French) « Ismaïla Manga au village des arts, carnet de voyage du peintre venu de Kamoya », article de Jean Pires dans Le Soleil, 13
