= Arthur's Stone (Kerikeri) =

Monument in New Zealand

Coordinates: 35.2726°S 173.9008°E

Arthur's Stone, located near Kerikeri, is recognised as New Zealand's earliest monument to a Pākehā (European). It was erected in November 1840, by Reverend Richard Taylor in memory of his 10-year-old son Arthur who died at the site as a result of a fall from a horse. The stone was entered into the Heritage New Zealand list of historic places on 14 May 2008, as a Category 1 List No:7743.

== History ==
The stone was erected on 9 November 1840, by Reverend Richard Taylor as a memorial to his son Arthur. Taylor wrote an account in his journal of the memorial being erected stating he had returned that same evening "having waited to see a basaltic column of 7½ feet put up on the spot where poor Arthur met his death. It was carried from the Kerikeri". The following day Taylor and a person named Steele returned to the site whitewashed the stone, cleared a circle around its base and planted it with clover.

Ten-year-old Arthur Taylor was accompanying his father Reverend Richard Taylor from Kerikeri to Waimate to meet his mother, when according to a contemporary report, the horse he was riding was startled by a touch of a switch and bolted, causing Arthur to fall from the saddle and being dragged by the stirrup resulting in his death on October 12, 1840.
