= Bernard Frize =

French painter (born 1949)

- Born: 1949 (age 76–77)
- Website: http://www.bernardfrize.com/

Bernard Frize (born 1949) is a French painter who works in a variety of materials and utilizes a multitude of techniques.

== Life and works ==
He was born in Saint-Mandé, France. As an artist he explores the bare minimal essence of painting, devoid of conception and aesthetic, instead focusing on an industrial approach to making art. His work is highly process-oriented, often requiring unconventional tools, materials, and the assistance of others to complete a painting.

Frize looks at a painting as a search for an agreement between "nature", a viewer and a flat surface. He states at an interview with Jane Peterson, a journalist, "This is what my paintings are about and why they are not about the process. Nevertheless, the process is a way of engaging the viewer in a kind of simultaneity."

Frize's artworks have been exhibited extensively across Europe (Sans repentir at the Centre Pompidou curated by Angela Lampe in 2019) and the UK (Ikon Gallery in Birmingham, as one example), as well as recently in the United States. He is represented by the Galerie Emmanuel Perrotin in Paris and Miami, Marian Goodman in New York, Paris and Los Angeles and Galerie Nächst St. Stephan in Vienna.

Frize lives and works in Paris and Berlin.
