= Hallmark University =

Private University

Coordinates: 29.538378°N 98.568527°W

Hallmark University is a private university in San Antonio, Texas.

== History ==
The school was authorized by the FAA to teach aircraft maintenance in 1969. In 1974, Richard Fessler became President of Hallmark and led in that capacity through 1999. His vision and commitment to quality education led the expansion of the college into numerous fields of training, including business and electronic engineering. The electronics program was launched in 1981.

In 1982, Hallmark became the first private career school in the State of Texas to be awarded associate degree-granting authority. This expansion of offerings and a growing enrollment led to the addition of two new campuses which continue to serve the college today. In 1985, a second campus opened in the north central San Antonio area. By 1988, the business program was launched at the second campus.

In 1995, Hallmark Aero-Tech was renamed Hallmark Institute of Aeronautics and Hallmark Institute of Technology.

By 2003, the computer networking, medical assisting, and business office administration programs were launched.

In August 2007, Hallmark Institute became Hallmark College, and in 2015 became Hallmark University. It offers degrees in healthcare administration and nursing, aeronautics, business, and computer science. Hallmark's first registered nursing program (first cohort) began in 2011.

== Academics ==
The university offers associate degrees, bachelor's degrees, and Master of Business Administration degrees. These programs are housed in three colleges and one school:

- College of Aeronautics
- School of Information Technology
- School of Business
- School of Nursing

Hallmark University is accredited by the Accrediting Commission of Career Schools and Colleges (ACCSC).
