= Cor Melchers =

Dutch painter

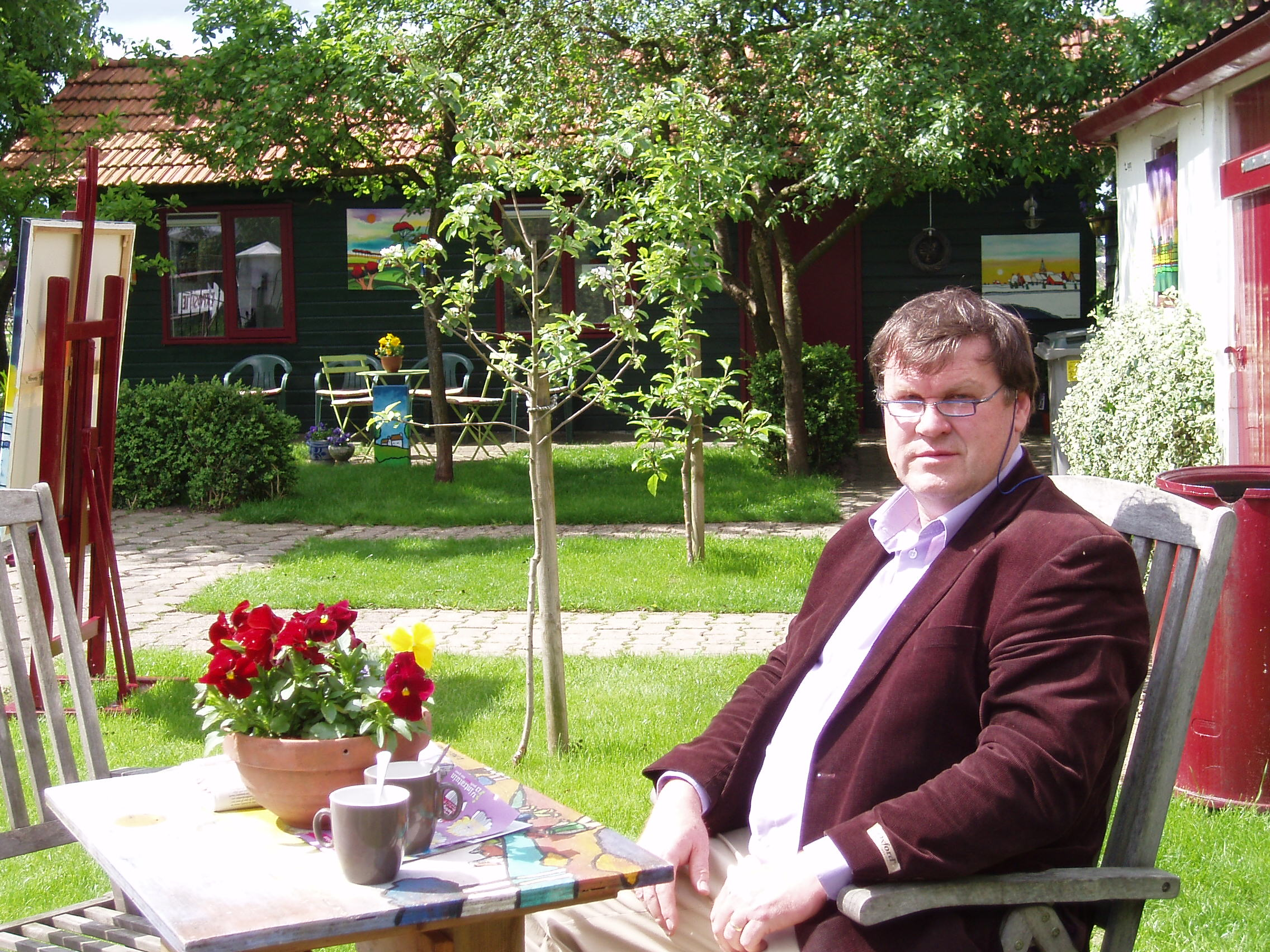
- Melchers in his garden in front of his atelier in Huissen
- Born: 1954; Huissen, the Netherlands
- Died: 15 September 2015 (aged 60–61)
- Occupation: Painter

Cor Melchers (1954 – 15 September 2015) was a Dutch painter.

== Life ==
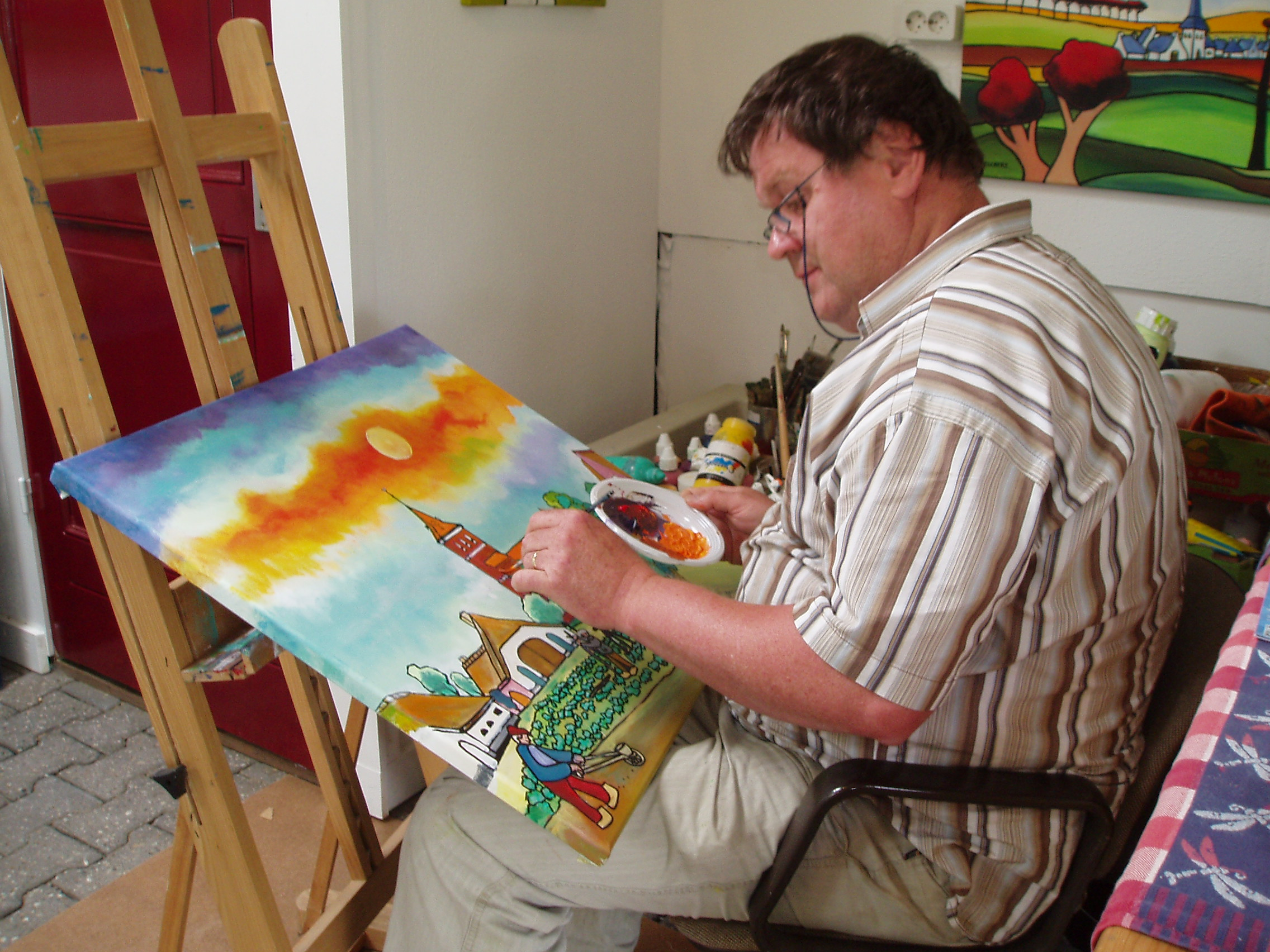
Melchers painting

Melchers was born and grew up in Huissen. He was a teacher at the primary school De Laarakker in Arnhem. He started painting in 2003 and became more populair with his naive expressionist work. He won the Mieke Bles Art Prize with its romantic landscapes, impressions of villages, towns and Betuwse orchards in 2008. He exhibited, in the Netherlands (including Hotel Pulitzer, Amsterdam) and Italy. His atelier was located where he lived, in Huissen. In 2014 his biography was published "Cor Melchers, schilder van kleurende eenvoud" (translated: Cor Melchers, painter of coloring simplicity.)

Melchers was engaged in promoting art. He gave workshops, collaborated on a children's book, and established Huissen Kunst in de Etalage and art platform Kunstplatform Mea Vota.

On September 31, 2015, Melchers died from legionnaires' disease at the age of 61.
