= Aikaterini Gegisian =

Aikaterini Gegisian (Armenian: Էկատերինի Գեգիսյան), born in Thessaloniki, Greece, is a visual artist, filmmaker, educator, and researcher. Her collage practice spans various mediums, including film, photography, installation, and textile design. She often utilises the photobook format; in 2015, she published her debut photobook, "A Small Guide to the Invisible Seas," contributing to the award-winning Armenian Pavilion at the 56th Venice Biennale. Her second book, "Handbook of the Spontaneous Other," was published by MACK in 2020 and received international acclaim.

Throughout her career, Aikaterini Gegisian has held several fellowships and residencies : as a Kluge Research Fellow at the Library of Congress (2017–2018), a Fellow at the Künstlerhaus Büchsenhausen, Austria (2018), and as a Visiting Scholar at the University of Pennsylvania (2014). Her accolades include the Nagoya University Award in 2001 and a shortlist nomination for the First Book Award in 2015. In 2016, the Middlesbrough Institute of Modern Art hosted the first survey of her moving image practice.

Her work has been exhibited in various international survey exhibitions, including the 8th Brighton Photo Biennale (2018), the 6th Moscow Biennale (2015), and the 3rd Mardin Biennale (2015). She has reached audiences in several cultural institutions around the world, such as the International Center of Photography in New York (2023), the MOMus-Museum of Modern Art in Greece (2023), and the Halle 14 Centre of Contemporary Art in Leipzig (2021). She has also presented her work at the Institut Valencià d’Art Modern in Valencia (2020), the Whitworth in Manchester (2019), and the National Arts Museum of China in Beijing (2018). Other venues include the MacKenzie Art Gallery in Canada (2018), The Jewish Museum in Moscow (2018), Kunsthalle Osnabrück in Germany (2017), DEPO in Istanbul (2017), BALTIC in Newcastle (2017), Calvert 22 Foundation in London (2016), and the Stavros Niarchos Foundation Cultural Centre in Athens (2016). Additionally, her work has been shown at the Centre for Contemporary Art in Thessaloniki (2012), Spike Island Gallery in Bristol (2012), Kasseler Dok Fest in Germany (2016), and the Oberhausen Film Festival (2006).

== Collections ==
Frac des Pays de la Loire, France Middlesbrough Institute of Modern Art, UK MOMus–Museum of Contemporary Art, Greece California Museum of Photography, USA Private Collections in Greece, UK, Ireland, Germany, USA and Canada

== Honours and awards ==
Golden Lion, 56 th Venice Biennale (2015) Part of the exhibiting artists representing Armenia at the 56 th Venice Biennale. Armenia Pavilion was awarded the Golden Lion for the best national participation.
Arts and Humanities Research Council, Kluge Research Fellow Award, UK (2017) Awarded yearly to postdoctoral researchers, in order to pursue primary research at the Library of Congress, Washington, DC.
The Centre for Education and Research in Arts and Media (CREAM), University of Westminster, PhD Studentship (2011–2014) Awarded Full Academic Graduate Scholarship for the completion of a PhD by Practice at the University of Westminster.
Arts and Humanities Research Council, UK, Research Preparation Bursary (2005) Awarded Full Academic Graduate Scholarship for the completion of MA in Fine Art degree at Chelsea College of Art & Design (University of the Arts London).
First Prize, Nagoya University of Arts, Japan (2001) Awarded to art school graduates for their Degree Show Exhibition at the University of Brighton through a reciprocal agreement with Nagoya University of Arts.

== Selected exhibitions ==
=== Solo Exhibitions ===
- 2021 : Exercises in Speaking Out, Vol 2 (Architecture). Triskel Art Center, Cork, Ireland

Curated by Miguel Amado

- 2017 : In Reverse, DEPO, Istanbul, Turkey (catalogue)
- 2016 : Shifting Geographies. Middlesbrough Institute of Modern Art, UK
- 2015 : (in)visible territories. Kalfayan Galleries, Athens, Greece
- 2014 : Is this Why I Cannot Tell Lies? Tintype Gallery, London, UK

=== Group Exhibitions ===
- 2023 : Love Songs, International Center of Photography (ICP), New York.Curated by Sara Raza.
- 2022 : Nature Tracers, MOMus- Museum of Modern Art, Thessaloniki, Greece. Parallel Programme of the 8th Thessaloniki Biennale. Curated by Maria Tsantsanoglou.
- 2021 : Notions of Identity. Halle 14 Centre of Contemporary Art, Leipzig, Germany.

Collage Architecture. Triskel Art Center, Cork, Ireland. Curated by Miguel Amado.

- 2020 : Orientalism. The Institut Valencià d’Art Modern (IVAM), Valencia, Spain.

Curated by Rogelio López Cuenca & Sergio Rubira (catalogue).

- 2019 : Joy for Ever. The Whitworth, Manchester, UK. Curated by Poppy Bowers.
- 2018 : Punk Orientalism. MacKenzie Art Gallery, Regina, Canada. Curated by Sara Raza.

A New Europe. Brighton Photo Biennial, Brighton, UK. Curated by Shoair Malvian. The Human Condition. The Jewish Museum, Moscow, Russia. Curated by Victor Misiano.

- 2017 : Contemporary Greek Artists. National Art Museum of China, Beijing, China. Curated by Maria Tsantsanoglou and Syrago Tsiara (catalogue).

Disappearance at Sea – Mare Nostrum. BALTIC, Newcastle, UK. Curated by Alessandro Vincentelli. Homeland. Kunsthalle Osnabruck, Osnabruck, Germany. Curated by Christian Oxenius.

- 2016 : Power & Architecture. Calvert 22 Foundation, London, UK.
- 2015 : Armenity. 56 th Venice Biennale, Armenian National Pavilion, Venice, Italy. (Golden Lion Winner) Curated by Adelina Cüberyan v. Fürstenberg (catalogue).
- 2014 : Mythologies. 3rd Mardin Biennale, Mardin, Turkey. Curated by Döne Otyam.

Visualising the Ottoman City. Peltz Gallery, Birkbeck College, London, UK Curated by Leslie Hakim-Dowek (catalogue)

== Selected screenings ==
2018 | Immaterial Collection II: Forum. Beirut Art Centre, Lebanon
2016 | Kasseller Documentary Film Festival. Kassel, Germany
2012 | Estonian Fair of Photographic Art. Tallinn, Estonia
2009 | Synch Festival. Technopolis, Athens. Greece
2008 | North West Film Forum. Seattle, USA
4th ZEBRA Poetry Film Festival. Berlin, Germany
PureScreen. Castlefield Gallery, Manchester, UK
2006 | 52 nd International Short Film Festival Oberhausen. Oberhausen, Germany
2005 | Strange Screen 5. Museum of Cinema, Thessaloniki, Greece
Art in the Age of New Technologies. 2nd International Media Art Festival,
Armenian Centre for Contemporary Experimental Art, Yerevan, Armenia
prog:ME, 1st Festival of Electronic Media, Rio de Janeiro, Brazil
2004 | Videoformes Festival. Clermont-Ferrand, France
Hertzoscópio - Experimental & Trans-disciplinary Arts Festival. Lisbon, Portugal
2003 | Lux Open. Royal College of Art, London, UK
2002 | Mobile Utopia. Aristotelio University, Thessaloniki, Greece

== External references ==
- Handbook of the Spontaneous Other,
- Interview, In Pop Culture and Propaganda, an Alternate History of the Cold War Era,
- Article on Handbook of the Spontaneous Other, in AnOther Magazine,
- Article of Phroom Magazine on Handbook of the Spontaneous Other,
- Article by The British Journal of Photography on A guide to the Invisible Seas,
- Interview by Art Plugged,
- Interview by The Seen Journal,
- Interview by This is Tomorrow,
- Article by Meer,
- Article by Glean,
- Article by Itv,
- Aikaterini Gegisian and Miguel Amado in Conversation, Triskel Arts Centre,
- Αικατερίνη Γεγησιάν - Nitra Gallery Athens, από το Athens Culture Net,
- Aikaterini Gegisian & David Kazanjian: a new type of feminist collage, Mack,
- Turn Back Tide - artwork by Aikaterini Gegisian,
- Salon | Mapping Time and Space, Art Basel
- Artist Talk: Aikaterini Gegisian, Spike Island Bristol
