= Salvo (artist) =

Italian painter

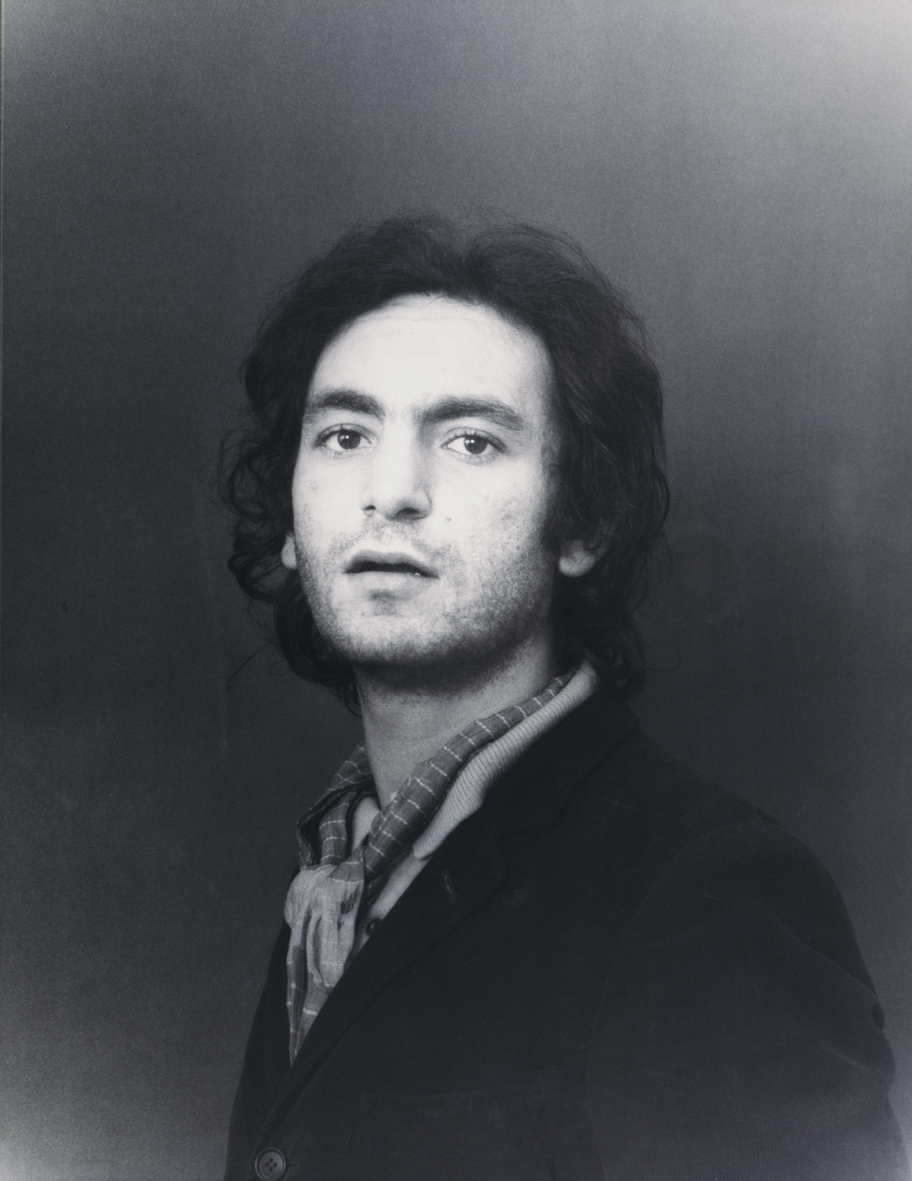
Self Portrait as Raphael, 1970. Photo mounted on aluminium, 65 cm × 49 cm (26 in × 19 in).

Salvatore Mangione (22 May 1947 in Leonforte – 12 September 2015 in Turin), known professionally as Salvo, was an Italian artist who lived and worked in Turin.

Turin became Salvo's artistic home after his family, originally from Sicily, moved there in 1956. He began with portraits and landscapes, then joined the burgeoning Arte Povera movement. This period saw him collaborate with prominent artists. Salvo's work then shifted towards conceptual art, using marble inscriptions to explore self, history, and identity. In a surprising turn, he returned to traditional painting in the 1970s. This prolific period involved a unique dialogue with classical masters, in which he integrated self-portraiture with historical commentary.
