= Gerald W. Smith =

American engineer and author

Gerald W. Smith (December 1, 1929 – August 5, 2017) was the American author of "Engineering Economy: Analysis of Capital Expenditures" (Iowa State Press) the textbook used by several generations of Industrial Engineering college students from around the world. He is an Emeritus Professor of Industrial and Manufacturing Systems Engineering at Iowa State University in Ames, Iowa where he was a Professor of Industrial Engineering from 1956 to 1988. He received degrees in Engineering from Iowa State University with a Bachelor of Science in 1952, Masters of Science in 1958, P.H.D. in 1961. His 1958 masters theses was entitled "The Obsolescence Allowance in Equipment Replacement Decisions" and his 1961 P.H.D. dissertation "Regulatory Policies on Liberalized Depreciation and Their Effects Upon Public Utilities."

Four editions of his textbook were published in 1968, 1973, 1979, and 1987. While writing his book, Smith worked in his home office next to a window overlooking the house next door where Iowa State University professor John Vincent Atanasoff had lived while building the world's first electronic digital computer from 1937 to 1942. The second edition of his textbook "Engineering Economy: Analysis of Capital Expenditures" is ideally suited as a first course in Engineering Economics.

He served in virtually all of the Offices of the Engineering Economy Division of American Society for Engineering Education (ASEE), including serving as chairman. In 1964 he was Iowa State's representative at the General Electric Professors conference; from 1968 to 1971 he was designated Iowa State's Alcoa Professor; in 1969 he was the recipient of the Eugene L. Grant Award for best paper in The Engineering Economist from the American Society for Engineering Education (ASEE). From 1970 to 1976 he served that journal as an associate editor for Book Reviews; he has also served on the editorial board of IIE Transactions. He and his graduate students contributed gratis their efforts in the annual publication Engineering Economy Abstracts, which he originated. In 1974 he received the Iowa State University Faculty Citation; in 1981 he received the Outstanding Teacher Award from Iowa State's College of Engineering; in 1986 the Engineering Economy Division of the Institute for Industrial Engineers named him recipient of the Wellington Award for Outstanding Contributions in Engineering Economy. He had consulting and industrial experience, and was a registered professional engineer.

In addition to teaching at Iowa State, Smith taught engineering extension classes to Bell Telephone Systems engineers for two decades. He taught classes off-campus in Cedar Rapids, Waterloo and Dubuque, Iowa, and to Bell Telephone Laboratories in Murray Hill and Holmdel, New Jersey; Virgin Islands Telephone Company in St. Thomas, USVI; Otter Tail Power Company in Fergus Falls, Minnesota, and Alberta Telephone in Edmonton, Alberta, Canada.

He grew up in Sioux City, Iowa and played trumpet in his high school band at Sioux City Central High School.

He lived in Ames, Iowa until his death and is survived by his wife Phyllis and his son, photographer Brian Smith of Miami Beach, Florida.
