= Robert Schatz =

American painter and sculptor

Robert Schatz (born 1958 in Allentown, Pennsylvania) is an American painter and sculptor.

== Biography ==
Schatz studied at the Baum School of Art in Allentown He then earned his undergraduate degree from the University of Scranton. He then later studied at the Massachusetts College of Art and the Art Institute of Boston.

In 2007 Schatz had s solo exhibition at "The Phatory" in Manhattan's East Vîllage of which Brent Burket said in writing on the show for NYArts Magazine ..."f you care about abstract painting—especially if you care about really smart, technically deft abstract painting—you need to see Robert Schatz's show at The Phatory in Manhattan's Alphabet City. There, about a block off of Tompkins Square Park, Schatz has staged a little riot of his own"...

In 2015 Schatz's sculptures were the primary focud of the solo exhibition "A New Line of Thinking: Recent Sculpture by Robert Schatz January 16, 2015, mounted by the Sheldon Museum of Art at the University of Nebraska in Lincoln, Nebraska.

He is represented by the Jules Lazare gallery in New York and Stirner Modern in Easton, Pennsylvania.

== Work ==
Schatz's abstract oeuvre has been lauded for its diversity of materials employed. He currently works in three groups of pieces, metaphysically inspired paintings, 3d sculptures, and drawings.

Schatz himself has said of his 3d sculptures [that] "I build playfully enigmatic structures that perform like three-dimensional drawings moving through space in organic yet architectural ways."

His work is also heavily influenced by elements of Chinese snd Japanese art as well as urban graffiti.
