= Tintagel Castle =

Medieval fortification in North Cornwall, England

- Kastel Dintagel
- Tintagel, Cornwall, United Kingdom
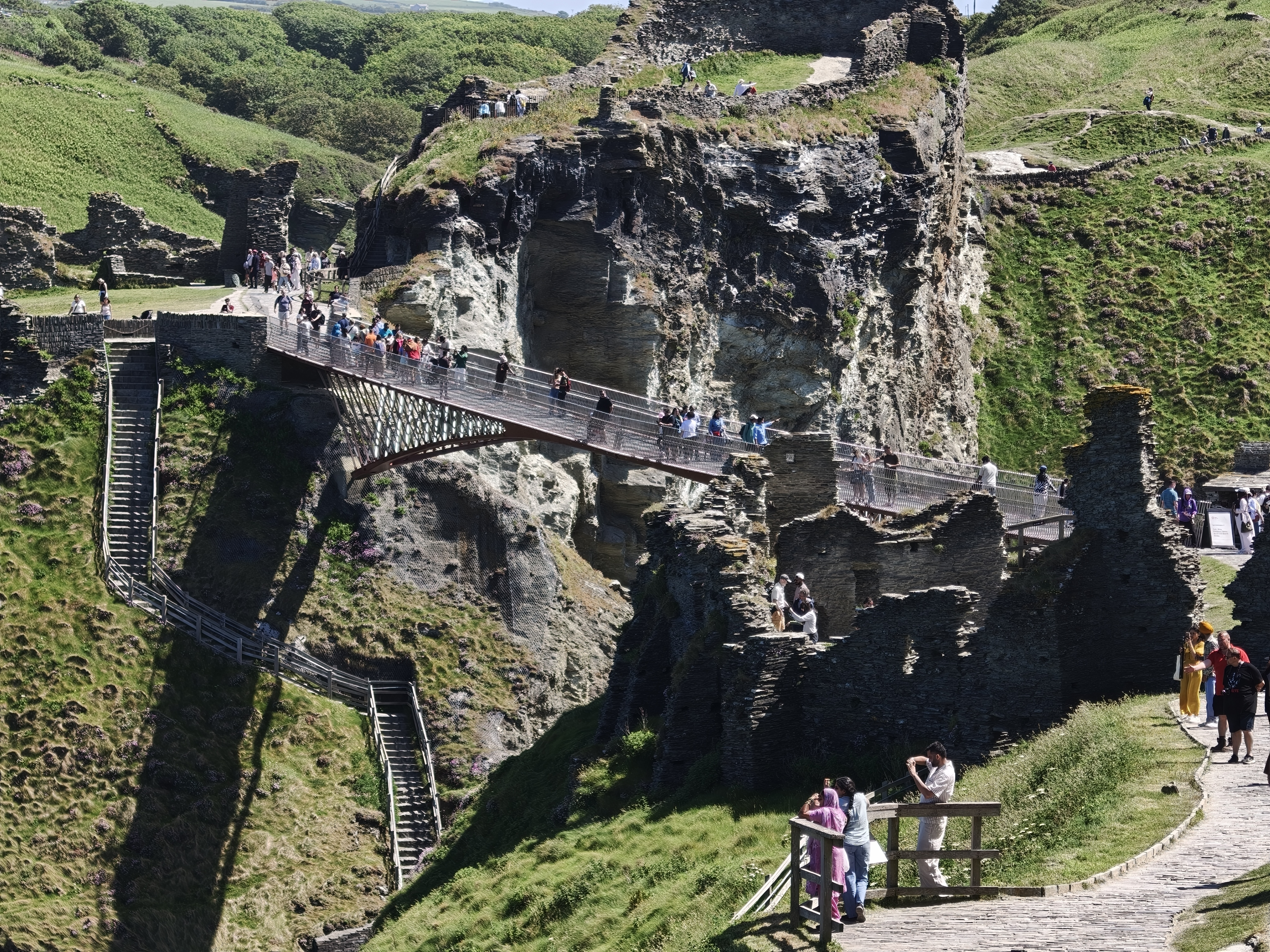
- The outer and upper wards of Tintagel Castle including the bridge.

Site information
- Owner: Duchy of Cornwall
- Controlled by: English Heritage
- Condition: Ruins

Location
- Location within Cornwall
- Coordinates: 50°40′05″N 4°45′36″W

Site history
- Built: 13th century
- Materials: Stone and rubble

Tintagel Castle /tɪnˈtædʒəl/ (Cornish: Kastel Dintagel) is a medieval fortification located on the peninsula of Tintagel Island adjacent to the village of Tintagel (Trevena), North Cornwall in the United Kingdom. The site was possibly occupied in the Romano-British period, as an array of artefacts dating from this period have been found on the peninsula, but as yet no Roman-era structure has been proven to have existed there. It was settled during the early medieval period, when it was probably one of the seasonal residences of the regional king of Dumnonia. A castle was built on the site by Richard, 1st Earl of Cornwall in the 13th century, during the High Middle Ages. It later fell into disrepair and ruin.

Archaeological investigation into the site began in the 19th century as it became a tourist attraction, with visitors coming to see the ruins of Richard's castle. In the 1930s, excavations revealed significant traces of a much earlier high status settlement, which had trading links with the Mediterranean world during the Late Roman period. Two digs in 2016 and 2017 at Tintagel Castle uncovered the outlines of a palace from the 5th or early 6th century (the early medieval period), with evidence of writing and of articles brought in from Spain and from the eastern end of the Mediterranean Sea. The Cornwall Archaeological Unit has a five-year project at this site, with a final report expected in 2021. The items found in the digs have spurred interest before this final report, with two television programmes initially aired in 2018 or 2019, one in the UK by the BBC and another in the US by PBS.

The castle has a long association with legends related to King Arthur. This was first recorded in the 12th century when Geoffrey of Monmouth described Tintagel as the place of Arthur's conception in his mythological account of British history, Historia Regum Britanniae. Geoffrey told the story that Arthur's father, King Uther Pendragon, was disguised by Merlin's sorcery to look like Gorlois, Duke of Cornwall, the husband of Igraine, Arthur's mother.

Tintagel Castle has been a tourist destination since the mid-19th century. While the castle is in the possession of William, Prince of Wales as part of the landholdings of the Duchy of Cornwall, the site is managed by English Heritage.

== History ==
=== Romano-British period ===
In the 1st century AD, southern Britain was invaded and occupied by the Roman Empire. The territory of modern Cornwall was assigned to the Roman administrative region of civitas Dumnoniorum, named after the local British tribal group whom the Romans called the Dumnonii. At the time, this south-westerly point of Britain was "remote, under-populated ... and therefore also unimportant [to the Roman authorities] until, during the 3rd century AD, the local tin-streaming industry attracted attention." Archaeologists know of five milestones or route-markers in Cornwall erected in the Romano-British period. Two of these are in the vicinity of Tintagel, indicating that a road passed through the locality.

Cornish historian and archaeologist Charles Thomas noted in 1993: "So far, no structure excavated on Tintagel Island... can be put forward as a Roman-period settlement, native-peasant or otherwise." Despite this, a quantity of apparently Romano-British pottery has been unearthed on the site, as has a Roman-style drawstring leather purse containing ten low denomination Roman coins dating between the reigns of Tetricus I (270–272) and Constantius II (337–361). This suggests that "at face-value ... either the Island or the landward area of the later Castle (or both...) formed the scene of third-fourth century habitation" even if no evidence has been found of any buildings dating from this period. Thomas also noted that some of the post-Roman finds in the excavations of 1933–38 were close to the wall known as the Iron Gate which guards access to the plateau from the adjacent cove. He suggests that the vessels bringing such goods might have come to unload at this cove rather than on the dangerous beach of Tintagel Haven.

=== Early medieval period ===
Roman control collapsed in southern Britain following the fall of the Western Roman Empire in the early 5th century and it split into various different kingdoms, each with its own respective chief or king. The former Roman district of civitas Dumnoniorum apparently became the Kingdom of Dumnonia, which would have been ruled over by its own monarchy during this early medieval period between the 5th and 8th centuries. It was in this regional background that settlement continued at Tintagel Castle, with the creation of what is known by archaeologists as Period II of the site. However, there has been some dispute amongst archaeologists as to what the site of Tintagel Island was used for in this period. In the mid-20th century, it was typically thought that there was a Celtic Christian monastery on the site, but "since about 1980... [this] thesis... has... had to be abandoned", with archaeologists now believing that it was instead an elite settlement inhabited by a powerful local warlord or even Dumnonian royalty.

The Devon archaeologist Ralegh Radford excavated at the site from 1933 through to 1938, and he pioneered the hypothesis that Tintagel Castle had been a monastery during Period II. He came to this conclusion based upon some similarities in the structures of the early medieval elements of Tintagel Castle and the 7th-century monastery at the site of Whitby Abbey in Yorkshire.

Archaeologists no longer accept this viewpoint, however. Instead, they now believe that this was an elite settlement in the early medieval period that was inhabited by Dumnonian royalty and their entourage. Archaeologist and historian Charles Thomas believed that they did not stay at Tintagel year-round but that they moved around: "A typical king with his family, relatives, dependants, resident hostages, officials and court-followers, and a private militia or war-band—in all, probably between a hundred and three hundred souls at least—moved around with his cumbersome entourage; at least, when not busy with inter-tribal campaigning or in repelling invaders and raiders." The site was also made more defensible during this period with a large ditch at the entrance to the peninsula, leaving only a narrow trackway that had to be traversed by anyone approaching the peninsula.

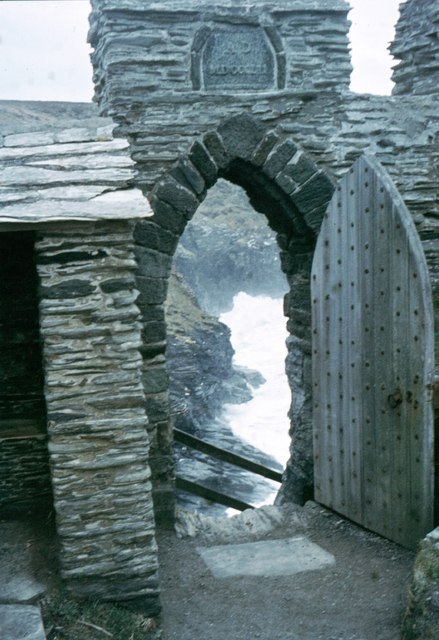
The Victorian courtyard wall

Various luxury items dating from this period have been found at the site, namely African and Phocaean red slip, which had been traded all the way from the Mediterranean. Examining this pottery, Charles Thomas remarked that "the quantity of imported pottery from Tintagel [was]... dramatically greater than that from any other single site dated to about 450–600 in either Britain or Ireland". Carrying on from this, he noted that the quantity of imported pottery from Tintagel was "larger than the combined total of all such pottery from all known sites [of this period in Britain and Ireland]; and, given that only about 5 per cent of the Island's accessible surface has been excavated or examined, the original total of imports may well have been on a scale of one or more complete shiploads, with individual ships perhaps carrying a cargo of six or seven hundred amphorae." This evidence led him to believe that Tintagel was a site where ships docked to deposit their cargo from southern Europe in the early medieval period.

Archaeological digs by the Cornwall Archaeological Unit funded by English Heritage in 2016 and 2017 at Tintagel Castle uncovered the outlines of a palace from the 5th or 6th century, more amphora shards, and slate with writing on it, dispelling notions that no one knew how to read and write in this era following the collapse of the Roman Empire. The five-year project expects to finish and publish a report in 2021. One find is described briefly in an article; it has been put on display at the site by English Heritage. The findings have stirred much interest for their implications about the Dark Ages in Cornwall after the Roman Empire collapsed. The dig site is described in a television programme with new theories about Early medieval Britain that first aired in the US in 2019. BBC Two aired a documentary in 2018 about the findings at this dig site.

=== Late medieval period and early modern periods ===
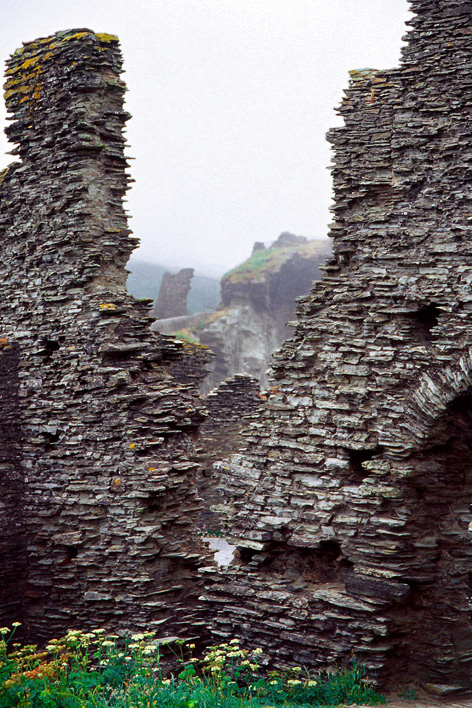
Ruins of the castle in 2005

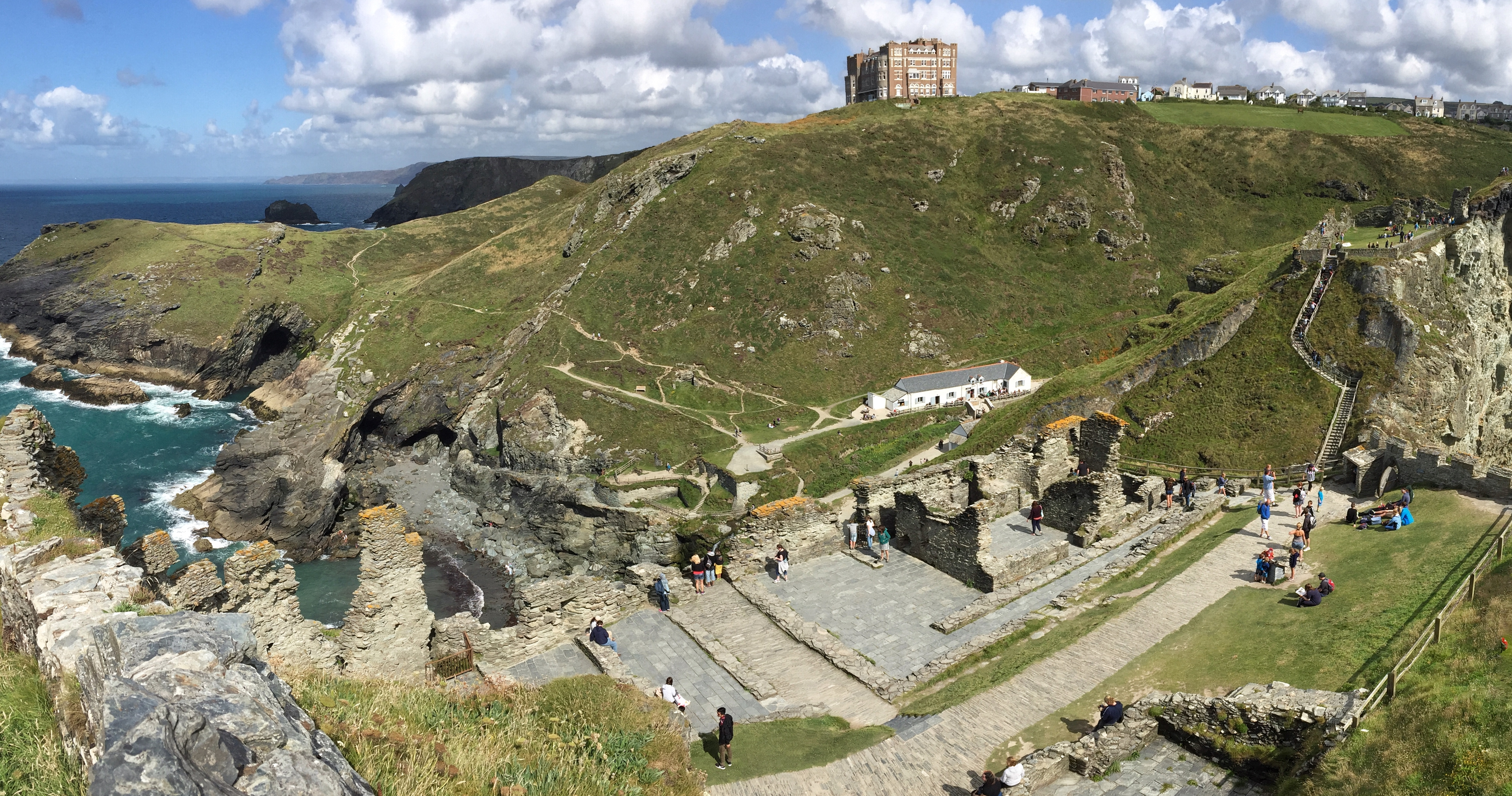
Remains of the 13th-century Tintagel Castle in 2016

In 1225, Richard, 1st Earl of Cornwall traded with Gervase de Tintagel, swapping the land of Merthen (originally part of the manor of Winnianton) for Tintagel Castle. A castle was built on the site by Earl Richard in 1233 to establish a connection with the Arthurian legends that were associated by Geoffrey of Monmouth with the area and because it was seen as the traditional place for Cornish kings. The castle was built in a more old-fashioned style for the time to make it appear more ancient. However, the dating to the period of Earl Richard has superseded Ralegh Radford's interpretation which attributed the earliest elements of the castle to Earl Reginald de Dunstanville and later elements to Earl Richard. Sidney Toy suggests an earlier period of construction in Castles: a short history of fortifications from 1600 B.C. to A. D. 1600 (London: Heinemann, 1939).

John Holland, 1st Duke of Exeter was appointed constable of Tintagel Castle in 1389. After Richard, the following Earls of Cornwall were not interested in the castle, and it was left to the High Sheriff of Cornwall. Parts of the accommodation were used as a prison and the land was let as pasture. The castle became more dilapidated, and the roof was removed from the Great Hall in the 1330s. Thereafter, the castle became more and more ruinous and there was progressive damage from the erosion of the isthmus that joined the castle to the mainland. John Leland visited in the early 1540s and found that a makeshift bridge of tree trunks gave access to the Island. England was threatened with invasion from Spain in the 1580s, and the defences were strengthened at the Iron Gate. The manor of Tintagel was among those seized by the Commonwealth government of the 1650s as Duchy of Cornwall property, returning to the Duchy upon the Restoration of 1660. The letting for sheep pasture continued until the 19th century.

=== 19th and 20th centuries ===
There was a fascination with the Arthurian legends during the Victorian era, and the ruins of the castle became a tourist destination. The modern day village of Tintagel was known as Trevena until the 1850s when it was found convenient by the Post Office to use the name of the parish rather than the name of the village. Tintagel is only the name of the headland; Tintagel Head itself is the extreme southwest point of Castle Island and the castle ruins are partly on the 'island' and partly on the adjoining mainland. The head of the island pointing out to sea is Pen Diu (Cornish: Penn Du "Black Head").

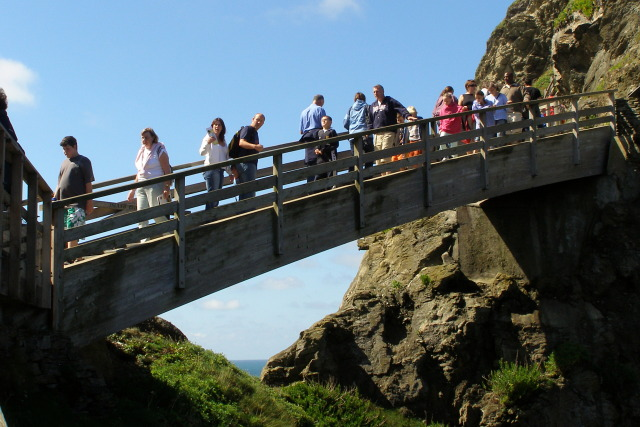
Footbridge to the Island in 2008

The Rev. R. B. Kinsman (d. 1894) was honorary constable and built the courtyard wall and a guide was employed to conduct visitors into the castle. Until his time, the steps were unsafe on either side of the isthmus, though the plateau could be reached by those who grazed sheep there. From 1870, a lead mine was worked for a short time near Merlin's Cave. In the 20th century, the site was maintained by the Office of Works and its successors (from 1929 onwards). In 1975, the access across the isthmus was improved by the installation of a wooden bridge.

In the late 19th and early 20th centuries nothing had been excavated except the chapel, and so ideas were given currency such as the garden being a cemetery and King Arthur's Footprint being a place for King Arthur to leap to the mainland. "King Arthur's Footprint" is a hollow in the rock at the highest point of Tintagel Island's southern side. It is not entirely natural, having been shaped by human hands at some stage. It may have been used for the inauguration of kings or chieftains, as the site has a long history stretching back to the Dark Ages.

In 1999, there was some controversy regarding Tintagel Castle and other sites in Cornwall under the management of English Heritage. Members of the pressure group Revived Cornish Stannary Parliament removed several signs because they objected to the use of the name "English Heritage", stating that Cornwall is rightfully a nation on its own. Three men involved in removing the signs were bound over for a year for £500 each and ordered to pay English Heritage £4,500 compensation.

=== 21st century ===
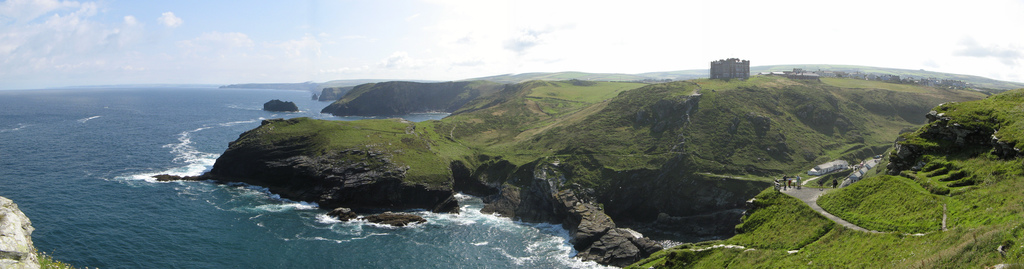
Panoramic view from Tintagel Castle, looking north-east; the prominent building is a hotel, built in 1899, now called the Camelot Castle Hotel; the headland below is Barras Nose

Over three months in 2015–16, artist Peter Graham carved a foot-high bearded face representing Merlin into a rock near a cave known as Merlin's Cave (after its mention in Tennyson's Idylls of the King). This was done as part of a project by English Heritage to "reimagine Tintagel's history and legends across the island site". The project also includes a compass sculpture referencing the Round Table and a larger-than-life statue called Gallos, by Rubin Eynon. Gallos is Cornish for power and its meaning is deliberately ambiguous as the statue could represent King Arthur or Tintagel's older royal past. A local councillor accused English Heritage of degrading the site's archaeology and landscape, although many local people are content with the image. Plans for a cantilevered steel footbridge to link Tintagel Island and the mainland, designed (by Ney & Partners and William Matthews Associates) to evoke Arthur's sword, were approved in 2017, and the bridge was opened to the public on 11 August 2019. Tintagel Castle Footbridge received an RIBA South West Award 2021, and was an RIBA Stirling Prize 2021 finalist.

Tintagel is one of English Heritage's top five attractions, with around 200,000 visitors a year and up to 3000 a day in the peak summer season. According to figures released by the Association of Leading Visitor Attractions, 154,996 people visited Tintagel Castle in 2019.

Tintagel Castle was one of six identified by English Heritage in September 2022 as being at risk of destruction due to coastal erosion, the rate of which they said had worsened in the last few years due to rising sea levels and frequent storms. Portions of the Tintagel Castle complex have historically fallen into the sea but by 2022, erosion had reached the front of the visitor centre, and parts of a coastal footpath and a viewing area had fallen into the sea.

In September 2022, English Heritage launched a fundraising campaign to protect and strengthen Tintagel Castle (and the five other at-risk sites).

== Arthurian legends ==
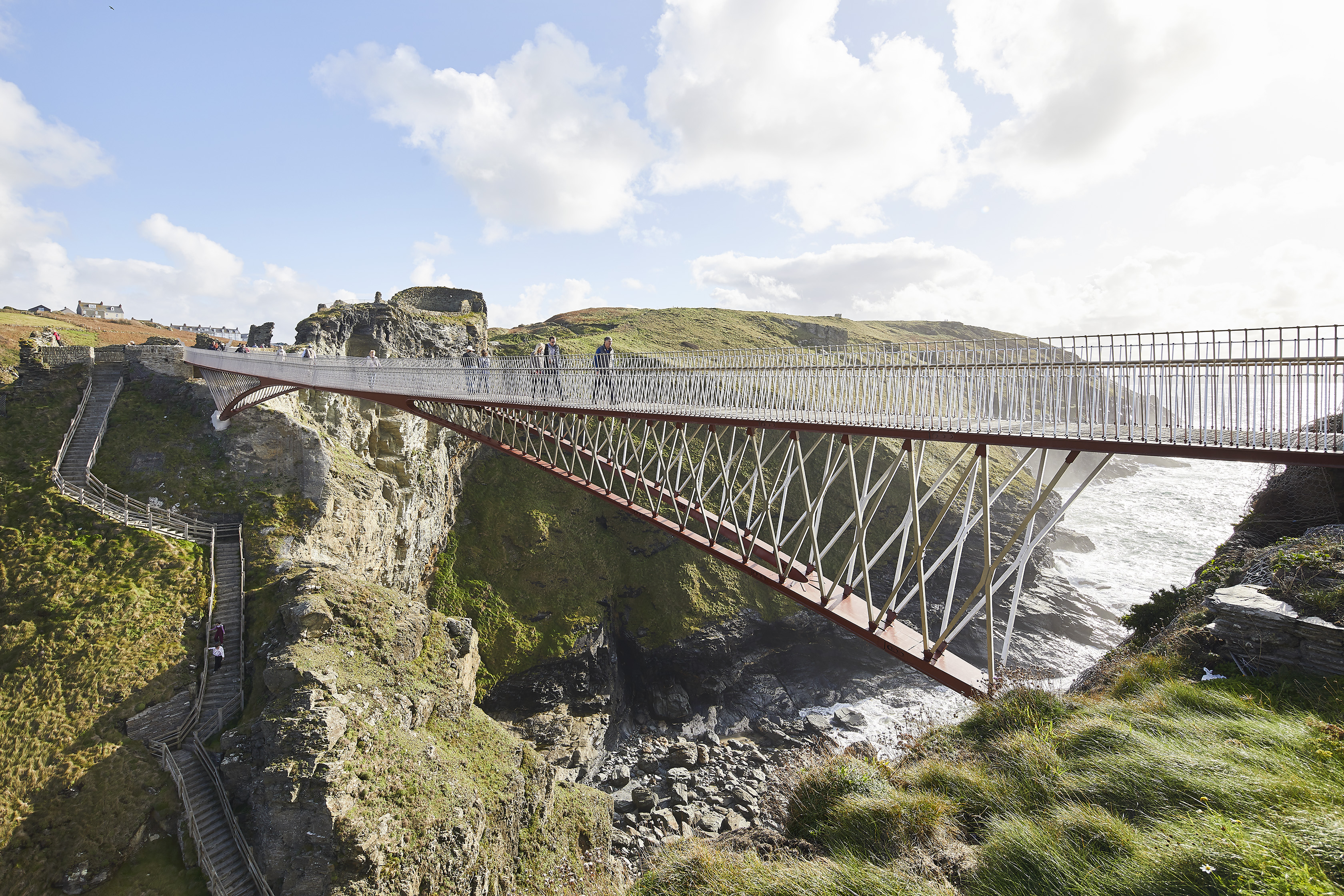
Footbridge to the Island in 2019

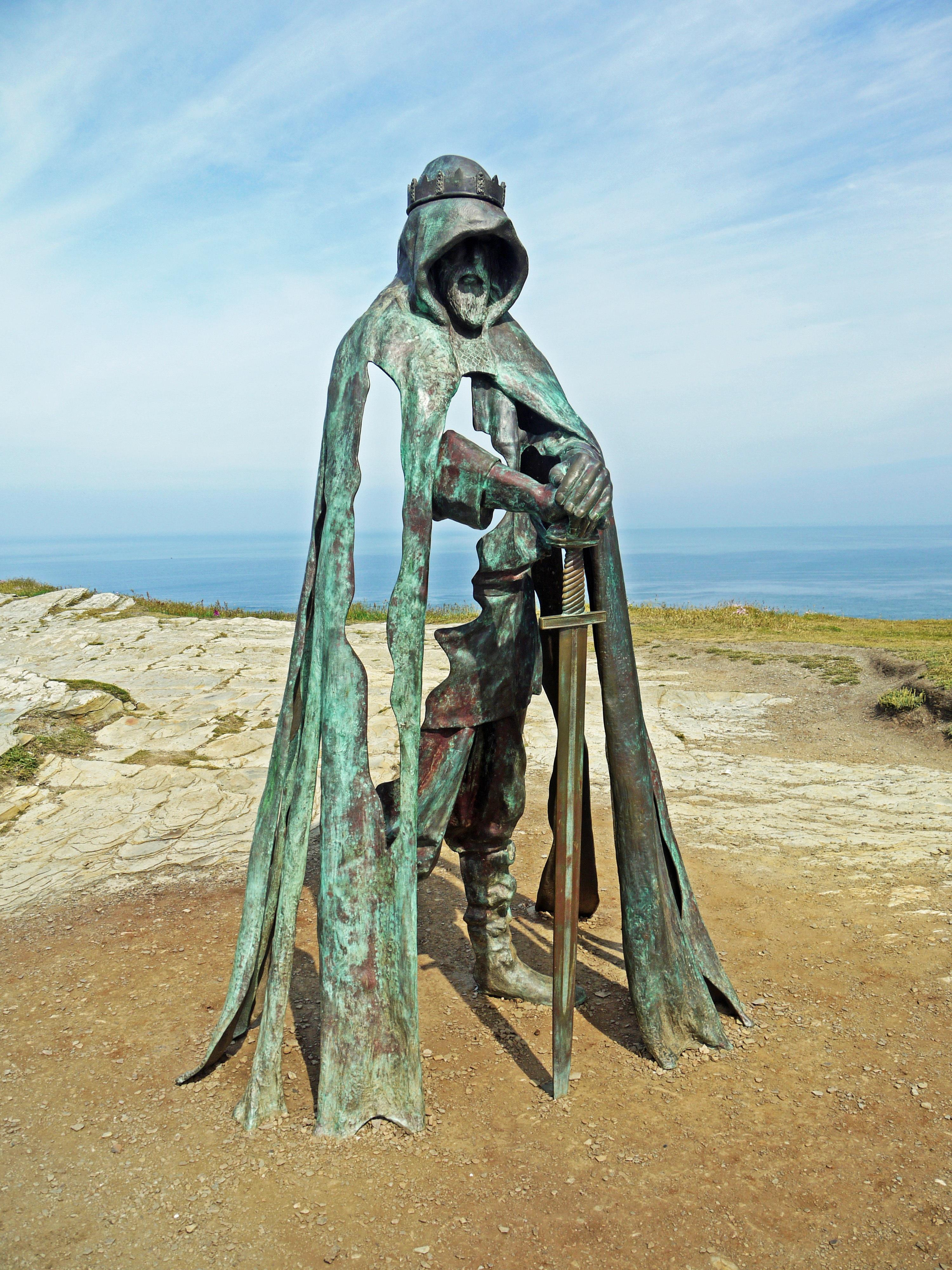
Statue of Gallos by Rubin Eynon at Tintagel

The castle has a long association with the Arthurian legends; it was first associated with King Arthur by Welshman Geoffrey of Monmouth in his book Historia Regum Britanniae ("History of the Kings of Britain'"), written around 1135–38, which includes a detailed account of the legend. According to Geoffrey and the legend, Arthur's father was Uther Pendragon, the king of all Britain. He goes to war against Gorlois, the Duke of Cornwall, to capture Gorlois' wife Igraine, with whom Uther has fallen in love. Gorlois defends himself against Uther's armies at his fort of Dimilioc, but he sends Igraine to stay safely within Tintagel Castle which is his most secure refuge, according to the legend and Historia Regum Britanniae. Uther besieges Dimilioc, telling his friend Ulfin how he loves Igraine, but Ulfin replies that it would be impossible to take Tintagel, for "it is right by the sea, and surrounded by the sea on all sides; and there is no other way into it, except that provided by a narrow rocky passage—and there, three armed warriors could forbid all entry, even if you took up your stand with the whole of Britain behind you." Geoffrey of Monmouth's story goes on to explain how the wizard Merlin is summoned and magically changes Uther's appearance to that of Gorlois to help get them into Tintagel Castle, while also changing his own and Ulfin's appearances to those of two of Gorlois' companions. Disguised thus, they are able to enter Tintagel where Uther goes to Igraine, and "in that night was the most famous of men, Arthur, conceived."

Geoffrey's History mentions Tintagel Castle as the site of Arthur's conception, but "it nowhere claims that Arthur was born at Tintagel, or that he ever visited the place in later life, or that in any sense the stronghold became his property when he was king." However, the legend and the book continued to become hugely popular, spreading across Britain in the Late Medieval period, when more Arthurian texts were produced, many of them continuing to propagate the idea that Arthur himself was actually born at Tintagel. There is now a footpath from the site to Cadbury Castle in Somerset called Arthur's Way.

However, many continue to argue against these legends. For example, archaeologist C.A. Ralegh Radford refused to believe in the legend and all of the associations, declaring in 1935 that "no concrete evidence whatsoever has yet been found to support the legendary connection of the Castle with King Arthur". Charles Thomas, a specialist in Cornish history, was unable to find solid links, mainly because legends and stories would have been handed down only orally during this period. Thomas stated in 1993 that "there simply is no independently attested connection in early Cornish folklore locating Arthur, at any age or in any capacity, at Tintagel." Many others disagree, maintaining that the legendary figure would essentially have been an Early Medieval British leader, involved in fighting the migrating Anglo-Saxons who were settling in Britain at that time. The Artognou stone was found at Tintagel bearing the inscription PATERN[--] COLI AVI FICIT ARTOGNOU , and it has been claimed by some to provide evidence for a historical Arthur, but most historians reject this view.

Tintagel is used as a locus for the Arthurian mythos by the poet Alfred, Lord Tennyson in the poem Idylls of the King. Letitia Elizabeth Landon's 1832 poetical illustration, A Legend of Tintagel Castle, to an engraving of a painting by Thomas Allom is another variation on the story of Lancelot and Elaine. Algernon Charles Swinburne's Tristram of Lyonesse is a literary version of the Tristan and Iseult legend in which some events are set at Tintagel. Thomas Hardy's The Famous Tragedy of the Queen of Cornwall at Tintagel in Lyonnesse, a one-act play which was published in 1923, is another version of the same legend with events set at Tintagel (the book includes an imaginary drawing of Tintagel Castle at the period).

== Excavations ==
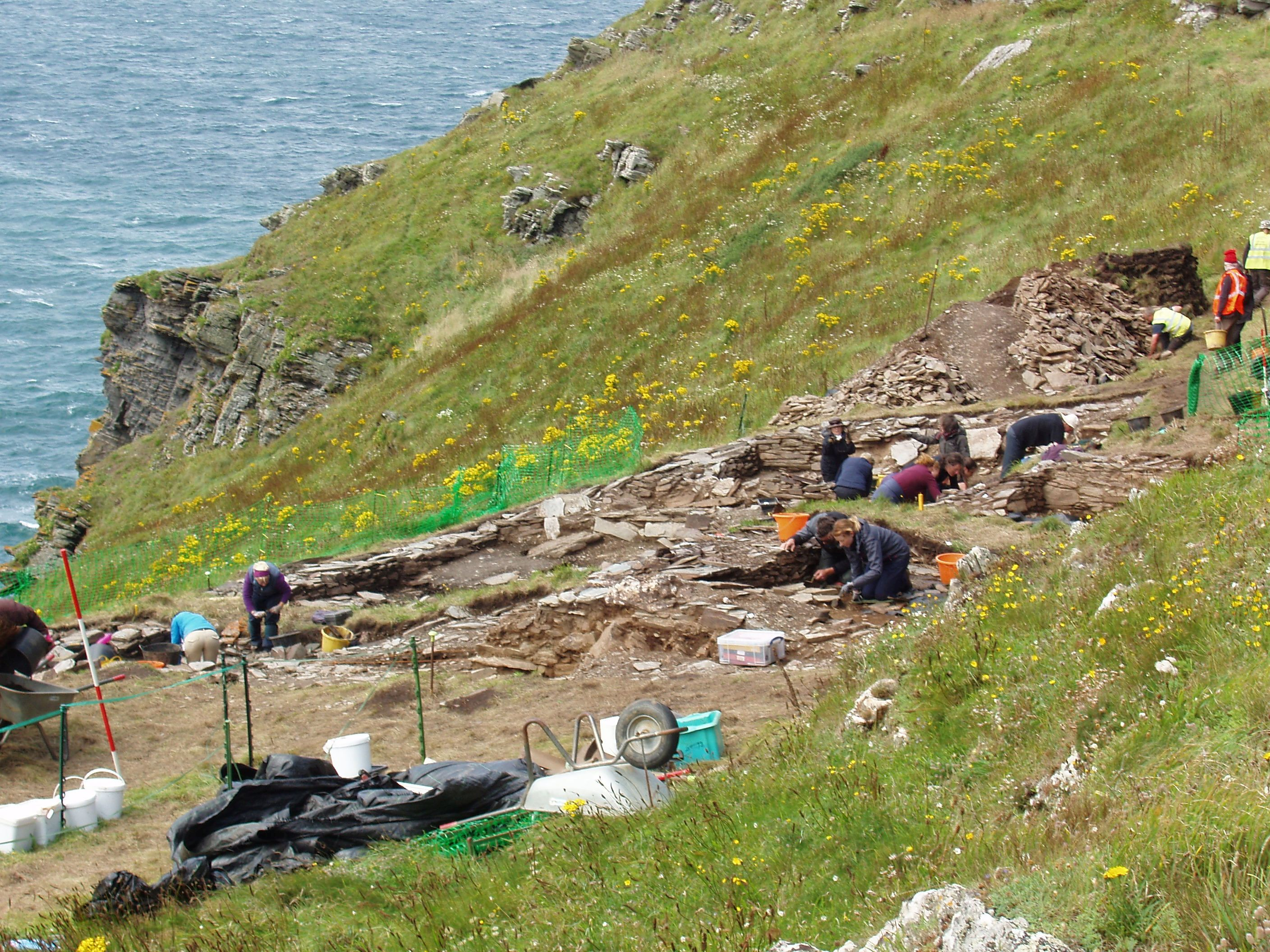
Excavation in August 2017

In the 1930s, it was decided to begin a major archaeological excavation at the site, and so HM Office of Works employed Devon archaeologist Courtenay Arthur Ralegh Radford (1900–1999) to work as site director. He had been employed as the Inspector of Ancient Monuments in Wales and Monmouthshire from 1929 and 1934, and from 1936 was Director of the British School at Rome. Excavation began in 1933, and in 1935 Ralegh Radford wrote an interim report and a guidebook entitled Tintagel Castle, published by HM Stationery Office. The excavators employed former quarry workers (the last Tintagel cliff quarry was closed in 1937) who worked under a trained foreman. They were instructed to clear the land on the island, following and exposing any walling that they came across and keeping any finds. Excavation ceased in 1939 due to the outbreak of the Second World War. Radford was required to take part in the war effort abroad, and many of the original site reports were destroyed when his house in Exeter was bombed by the Luftwaffe during the conflict.

In the mid-1980s, a fire on Tintagel Island led to considerable erosion of the topsoil, and many more building foundations could be seen than those recorded by Ralegh Radford. In 1998, the "Artognou stone", a slate stone bearing an incised inscription in Latin, was discovered on there, demonstrating that Latin literacy survived in this region after the collapse of Roman Britain.

Excavations during the summers of 2016 and 2017 found the remains of various structures from the Dark Ages, including well-constructed buildings of relatively large size dated to the 5th and 6th centuries, with pottery and glass finds indicating that the people who lived at Tintagel were of an upper class status, drinking wine imported from the eastern Mediterranean and using food vessels from North Africa and Gaul. In 2017, archaeologists discovered at the castle a 7th century slate window ledge inscribed with a mixture of Latin, Greek, and Celtic words, names, and symbols.

== See also ==
- Anglo-Saxon settlement of Britain
- Castles in Great Britain and Ireland
- List of castles in England
