= Gerald Steadman Smith =

Canadian artist

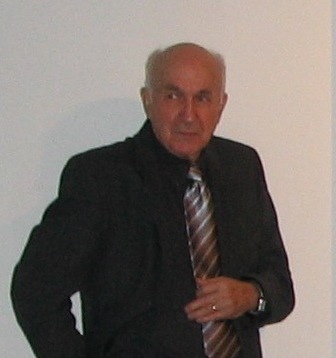
- Born: December 15, 1929; West Head, Nova Scotia, Canada
- Died: May 17, 2015 (aged 85); Ottawa, Ontario, Canada
- Occupation: Painter

Gerald Steadman Smith (December 15, 1929 – May 17, 2015) was a Canadian artist.

== Early life ==
Smith was born in 1929 in West Head, Cape Sable Island, Nova Scotia (NS). He spent his youth living with his parents, Lottie (Steadman) and Benjamin Smith, and two siblings, Sidney Smith and Dellas Smith Nickerson, on Cape Sable. Smith's early education (Grades 1–6) consisted of correspondence courses administered by the NS Department of Education. When he reached Grade 7 his father purchased a home in Clark's Harbour on Cape Sable Island so that the children could attend school on the mainland.

The family home on Cape Sable was part of the Cape Sable Light Station, a lighthouse facility, which was operated by the Canadian Department of Transport. Benjamin was the Head Lightkeeper of the station. Smith's childhood on Cape Sable exerted a strong influence on his career as it was there that he was exposed to the Atlantic Ocean and the lighthouse that served as subject matter for his early work and continued to provide a major influence on his work throughout his career.

After graduating from Clark's Harbour High School in 1947 Smith enlisted in the Royal Canadian Air Force where he served for five years as a Radar Technician achieving the rank of Leading Aircraftsman (LAC). During a stopover in Moncton, NB he had the opportunity to see an art show featuring the works of the Group of Seven painters which was showing in the lobby of the local CN hotel. This exhibit awakened a long-held interest in painting and he began to accumulate art books and to spend his furlough days visiting galleries in Montreal and the Ontario region where he was stationed.

In 1953 he voluntarily left the Air Force after five years of service and returned to Nova Scotia where he found employment as a Radar Technician with Fairey Aviation in Eastern Passage, NS. He later transferred to the position of Technical Illustrator with the same company. In this capacity he was involved in illustrating military hardware including the "Beartrap," a hauldown system that was designed by that company for installation on smaller naval ships to aid helicopter landings on rolling and pitching flight decks. As his interest in art continued to occupy his mind he enrolled in evening classes at the Nova Scotia College of Art and Design where he was encouraged by the Principal, Donald MacKay, to pursue an academic career.

== Academic and Teaching Career ==
In 1973, Smith was accepted into the Fine Arts Program at Mount Allison University. He graduated in 1976 with a Bachelor of Fine Arts Degree (with Distinction) after receiving many awards including the Wood and Gairdner Scholarships. In 1977 he moved his family to Saskatoon, SK where he received a Graduate Student Scholarship for enrollment into the Master of Arts Program at the University of Saskatchewan. In 1979 he graduated with a Master of Arts in Studio Painting. Following this he took up a number of teaching positions throughout Saskatchewan through the University of Saskatchewan's Extension Department. From 1978 to 1987 he taught painting and drawing in Melfort, Hudson Bay and Yorkton, Saskatchewan.

Under the auspices of the University of Saskatchewan he wrote and starred in a series of fourteen cable television shows in which he demonstrated various painting techniques. This series appeared on Saskatoon Telecable 10 in 1979.

In 1985, his wife's career with Agriculture Canada took Anna and Gerald to Regina and then on to Ottawa in 1987.

In 1988 Smith joined the faculty at the Ottawa School of Art (OSA) at the Downtown Campus at 35 George Street. There he taught painting and drawing for 24 years until his retirement in 2012 at age 83.

== Family ==
Smith met his future wife, Anna Oliver, at the Cape Sable Light Station through a long-time friend, Betty-June Smith (Richardson), who was married to Smith's brother Sidney, the Assistant Keeper at the station. Smith and Anna were married in Yarmouth, NS in August 1957. They settled in Dartmouth, NS where they raised four children (Roxanne –b.1958, Karen –b.1960, Jeffrey – b.1961 and Melanie – b.1964).

== Influences ==
The lighthouse at Cape Sable was equipped with a 3rd order Fresnel lens that when illuminated would cast off refracted light into the lantern room. Many of Smith's abstract paintings borrow from his experiences viewing the coloured light produced by this lens. Other influences include the works of Ellsworth Kelly, Chuck Close and Sandro Botticelli.

== Exhibitions ==
Smith's work is found in many public collections including the: Canada Council Art Bank, City of Ottawa, Mendel Art Gallery, University of Saskatchewan, St. Thomas Moore Gallery, Gairdner Fine Art Collection, Victoria General Hospital, Archelaus Smith Museum and over 200 private and public collections.

== Body of Work ==
Smith was very prolific though his long career that saw the creation of over original 800 original works of art most of which were landscape, figure and abstract paintings in oil and acrylic. He also produced a number of sculptural works in wood and stone but their production declined following the end of his academic career due to lack of studio space.

His success as a painter was connected to his fine drawing skills and which can be seen in the hundreds of figure drawings (primarily figure and still life) that he produced.

== Notable works ==
Moon Crater (1974 – triptych) was one of the first abstracts that Smith produced. It consisted of three 48" × 48" acrylic panels that when assembled comprised a series of coloured bands that transition from red to yellow, yellow to blue and from blue to red. Although the individual panels appear to represent an impact structure with a round central uplift and raised rim the comparison to the basic design of the glass panels in a Fresnel lens can also be understood.

At the Mendel #1 (1981) comprises a 47" × 57" oil on canvas painting of two figures (posed by his son Jeffrey and Karen Faul) in a gallery setting. This painting served as the first of 29 similarly themed works comprising figures in gallery settings with real or imagined art works and sculptural elements filling the space that Smith produced from 1981 through to 1997.

Michelle (1995 – inventory no. 95.1) comprises a 66" × 50" oil on canvas painting of the head of female model rendered in fine detail from the neck up. Smith produced a total of 26 similar themed images of large heads from 1995 to 2011 including: John Mlacak (2003, inventory no. 2003.1), Yves Larocque (2003, inventory no. 2003.3) and Jeremy Smith (2007, inventory no 2007.2).

The Journey (2002 – inventory no. 2002.1) comprises a 72" × 480" oil on canvas mural that was commissioned for Kanata Baptist Church in Kanata, ON. The painting depicts the migration of Abraham and a group of followers from Ur (Babylonia) to Canaan. The painting comprises a group of more than 40 figures walking or riding from right to left. The models were mostly drawn from fellow artists, students at the OSA and family members.

Floating Circle #6 (a.k.a. The Little Wow) (2007, inventory no. 2007.4) comprises one of a series of seven 40" × 40" or smaller acrylic on canvas abstracts with a round central element with horizontal bars or wedges set against or comprising an element in a background of bars and wedges. Most of these panels were all produced over a two-year period from 2005 to 2007. Comparisons can be made to early abstract pieces including Moon Crater, Saturn Transition 1 and Saturn Transition 2 (both produced in 1974) but more importantly the idea for these works were drawn from the artists consideration for the refracted light and the geometric design of concentric coloured circles of light that were observed in the Fresnel lens at the Cape Sable light station.

== Sources ==
- Smith, Gerald Steadman. 1979. Illusions of Line and Colour in my Paintings with References to Some of Their Sources.
- Krystyna Sadej, Ottawa School of Art – Faculty
- Gerald Smith Art Studio Website. About The Artist
- Nova Scotia Lighthouse Preservation Society (NSLPS). Cape Sable Archived April 2, 2015, at the Wayback Machine
- Gerald Steadman Smith contributor. 2008. Carte blanche. Volume 2, Painting / Jane Urquhart, forward; Clint Roenisch, essay.
- "Head's Up" exhibition features paintings by Stittsville artist Gerald Smith. Stittsvile News. January 24, 2006.
