= Gerry Smith =

English footballer (born 1939)

Personal information
- Full name: Gerald Smith
- Date of birth: 18 November 1939 (age 86)
- Place of birth: Dalton, England
- Position: Left winger

Youth career
- Lockwood Civic YC

Senior career*
Years	Team	Apps	(Gls)
1958–1960	Huddersfield Town	0	(0)
1960–1961	Bradford City	7	(0)
- Scarborough
- Frickley Colliery
- Denaby United
Total		7	(0)
- * Club domestic league appearances and goals

Gerald Smith (born 18 November 1939) is an English former semi-professional footballer who played as a left winger.

== Career ==
Born in Dalton, Smith spent his early career with Lockwood Civic YC and Huddersfield Town. He was signed by Bill Shankly for Huddersfield in May 1958.

He signed for Bradford City in July 1960, on part-time terms whilst he worked as a typewriter mechanic. He made a total of 11 appearances for the club, scoring 3 goals - 7 league, 3 FA Cup (scoring 2 goals), and 1 League Cup (scoring 1 goal). His League Cup game in November 1960, in which Bradford City beat Manchester United, was also Bradford City's first ever match in the competition.

He moved to Scarborough in June 1961, and later played for Frickley Colliery and Denaby United.

As of February 2013 Smith was living in Newsome with his wife, and had three grandchildren.

== Sources ==
- Frost, Terry (1988). Bradford City A Complete Record 1903-1988. Breedon Books Sport. ISBN 0-907969-38-0.
