= Arturo Carmassi =

Italian sculptor and painter

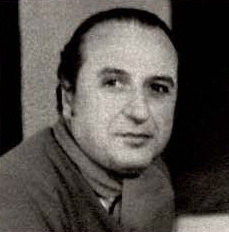
- Born: 2 July 1925; Lucca, Italy
- Died: 27 January 2015 (aged 89); Fucecchio, Province of Florence

Arturo Carmassi (2 July 1925 – 27 January 2015) was an Italian sculptor and painter.

== Life and career ==
Born in Lucca, Italy, Carmassi studied at the Accademia Albertina in Turin, and held his first exhibition in 1948. In 1950 he moved to Milan, where he embraced informalism. Exhibitions of his works held around the world include the Venice Biennale, the Brooklyn Museum in New York, the Antwerp Biennale of Sculpture and the São Paulo Art Biennial.
