= List of shipwrecks of Cornwall (19th century) =

The List of shipwrecks of Cornwall (19th century) lists the ships which sank on or near the coasts of mainland Cornwall in that period. The list includes ships that sustained a damaged hull, which were later refloated and repaired.

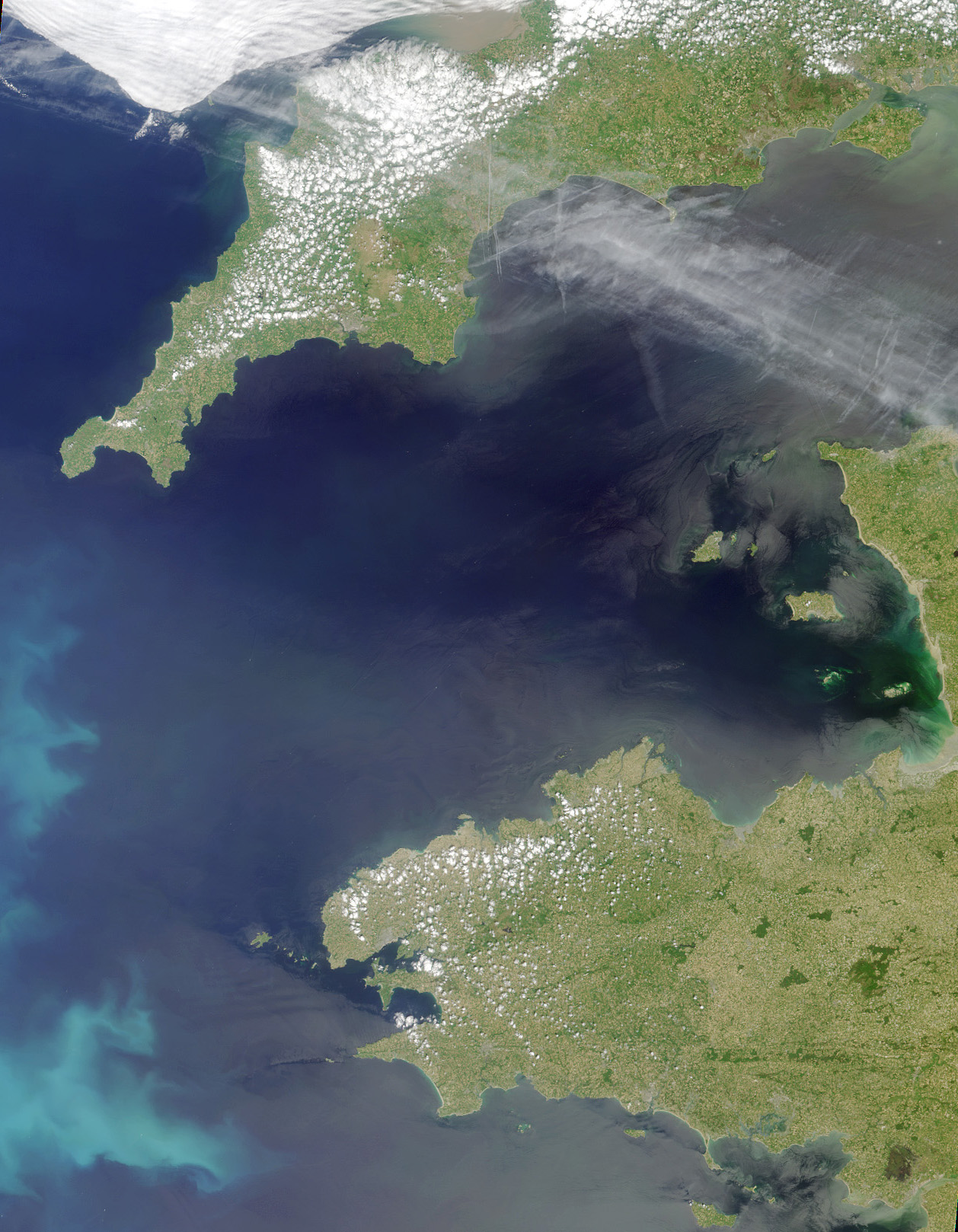
Southwestern England and the English Channel

- For ships wrecked both before and after the 19th century see List of shipwrecks of Cornwall or List of shipwrecks of Cornwall (20th century).
- For ships wrecked off the Isles of Scilly see List of shipwrecks of the Isles of Scilly.
- For ships wrecked on the Seven Stones Reef see List of shipwrecks of the Seven Stones Reef.

== 1801–1810 ==
- An estimated 25–30 vessels were lost on the Manacles off the east Lizard coast between about 1810 and 1855 with the loss of 700 to 800 lives.
- Between 1823 and 1846 almost 150 vessels were lost between Land's End and Trevose Head.

=== 1801 ===
- 9 January – Lark (United Kingdom) was abandoned by her crew when she sprang a leak in the Atlantic Ocean off Land's End. She was on a voyage from King's Lynn, Norfolk to Liverpool, Lancashire.
- 25 January – Rosannah (United Kingdom) foundered in the English Channel off The Lizard, Cornwall while on a voyage from Cork to London. Her crew were rescued.
- March — Julia (United Kingdom) was wrecked at St Michael's Mount.
- March — Providence (United Kingdom): was wrecked at St Michael's Mount, Cornwall.
- April — collier North Star (United Kingdom) struck a rock (on 13 April) and later sank at the pier on St Michael's Mount. Her cargo was salvaged.
- 2 November – brig Sally (United Kingdom) was driven ashore and wrecked in Mount's Bay.
- December — Britannia (United Kingdom) was driven ashore and wrecked near Padstow.
- December — Cornish Oak (United Kingdom): was driven ashore and wrecked near Padstow.
- December — Grinder (United Kingdom): was driven ashore and wrecked near Padstow.
- December — Padstow (United Kingdom): was wrecked near Padstow.
- unknown date — Windsor Castle (United Kingdom), a merchant ship (worth, with goods, £900) on the homeward leg from Calcutta wrecked off Land's End, Owner and Captain Henry Jackson. His son John and six men survived.

=== 1802 ===
- 2 March – Suffolk (United Kingdom) of London carrying bale goods and rice from Bengal driven ashore near the mouth of the Hayle river in a NE gale. Nineteen of the crew were saved by a line floated ashore from the ship, two died in their hammocks, too ill to move.
- a French mackerel boat was wrecked near Porthleven with the loss of eight crew.
- Princess Charlotte lost on the Manacles.

=== 1803 ===
- several wrecks in Mount's Bay during the winter of 1802–03 led to the setting up of a lifeboat station at Penzance following a donation by Lloyds and public subscription.

=== 1804 ===
- February – frigate HMS Fearless (Royal Navy) driven ashore near Redding Point on the Rame peninsula with the loss of one man.

=== 1805 ===
- Cotton Beach at Morwenstow named after the cargo of a wrecked ship.
- English cargo ship Betsey stranded at Bude whilst unloading. Her cargo was salvaged.

=== 1806 ===
- 7 March – unnamed ship (United Kingdom) struck the Runnelstone and sank while under escort by HMS Caroline (Royal Navy).

=== 1807 ===
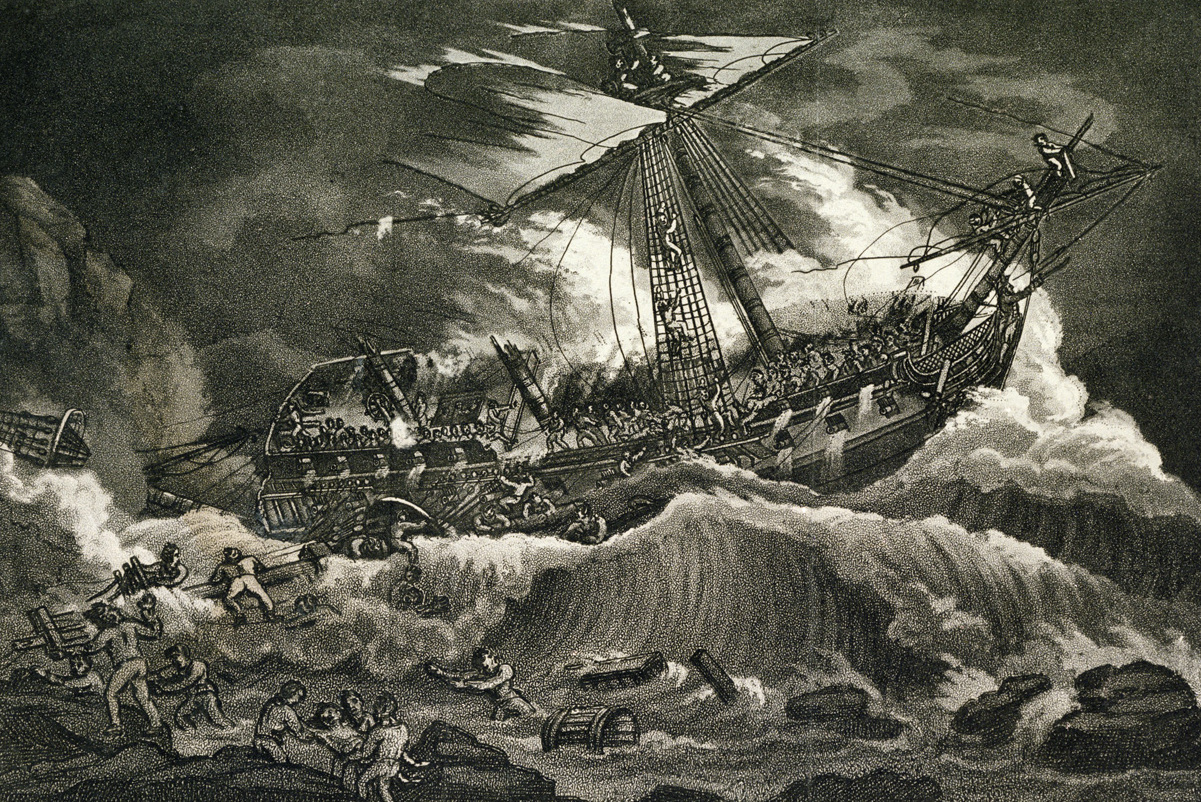
Loss of the Anson (engraving by William Elmes)

- 20 May – Spanish Navy warship Nuestra Senora de Boa St Quintera (Spanish Navy) wrecked on Pencra Head, near the Manacles.
- 4 November – brigantine Harmonia (Portugal) on voyage from Porto to Sligo with cork, wine and oranges driven ashore at Portreath. An attempt to save the crew ended when three of the would-be rescuers drowned. Captain and eight crew of the Harmonia were eventually saved.
- 7 November – the 400-ton James and Rebecca (United Kingdom) carrying the 9th Regiment of Dragoons cavalry along with their equipment and the officers' families (but not horses) home from a campaign against the Spanish in Buenos Aires. Ten sailors, 28 soldiers and three children drowned under Halzephron cliff and 36 of them were buried in a mass grave nearby.
- 20 November – several vessels were lost at St Ives.
- 21 November – navy tender HMS Bolina (Royal Navy), damaged in gale-force winds, was run ashore on the beach at Perranporth. One marine out of a crew of six was drowned earlier, when swept overboard.
- 29 December – HMS Anson (Royal Navy) driven onto the Loe Bar with the loss of an estimated 60–100 lives. Thomas Grylls, a local solicitor, drafted a new law which became the Burial of Drowned Persons Acts 1808 (also known as the Grylls' Act) to provide decent burial for drowned seamen; and Henry Trengrouse developed a rocket apparatus to shoot lines across the surf to shipwrecks, an early form of the breeches buoy.

=== 1808 ===
- 15 April – the Hermanest August bound for London from Porto with a cargo of wine and cork wrecked near Porthleven. Nine of the eleven crew drowned along with two local men trying to save them.

=== 1809 ===
- 6 January – 110-ton brig Royal Recovery wrecked near Porthleven while bound from Liverpool to London with a cargo of salt.
- 22 January – transport ship Dispatch sank after hitting Black Rock and the Brig-of-War HMS Primrose (Royal Navy) sank after hitting the nearby Manacles with the loss of almost two hundred lives. Sixty–eight died on Dispatch.
- unknown date – while bound for Tenerife from Dartmouth the 109-ton sloop Mars wrecked near Porthleven.
- unknown date – 500-ton Metis wrecked near Porthleven.
- unknown date – Old Wife wrecked near Porthleven.

=== 1810 ===
- 15 February – brig HMS Wild Boar Royal Navy lost on the Runnel Stone while outward bound from Falmouth with the loss of 12 lives.
- 16 February – Jemima (United Kingdom) out from Cork, the ship was driven ashore and wrecked in Whitsand Bay, south-east Cornwall with the loss of all hands.
- 25 March – out from Newport, sailing ship Brothers (United Kingdom) was stranded and became a total loss near Padstow.
- 26 March – sloop Mary (United Kingdom) foundered in the Atlantic Ocean off Land's End. Her crew were rescued.
- 11 September – the Swansea brig Fanny (United Kingdom) was lost in a gale the day after she left Hayle for Wales. Parts of the vessel washed up near Hayle in St Ives bay.
- 18 September – Penelope (United Kingdom) stranded near St Ives and became a total loss while bound for Swansea from St Ives.
- 10 November – Jenopher (United Kingdom) foundered six miles south of Mousehole with the loss of a crew member during a "big storm". Two others were reported to have been rescued.
- 14 November – Mary Ann (United Kingdom) sprung a leak off the Lizard and tried to make Falmouth. She overshot, made for Plymouth and dropped anchor in Whitsand Bay but was driven ashore. She was carrying bale goods, coffee, sugar and wine from her home port of London to Malta.
- 16 November – brig Clio (United Kingdom) of Kincardine wrecked on Loe Bar while carrying a cargo of barilla from the Azores. The captain and mate drowned but the three remaining crew survived. An alternative account gives the loss of all the crew and the cargo of barilla and wine, while en route from Tenerife to London.
- 16 November – in the same gale as the Clio all the crew of the brig Sans Ramon (Spain) drowned as she came ashore on Loe Bar. She was heading for Plymouth from Saloe with wine and most of her cargo was salvaged and sold at the Star Inn, Marazion on 2 September 1811.
- 23 November – Grenada bound for Plymouth with wine wrecked near Porthleven.
- 21 December – Eudora (United States) en route from Norfolk, Virginia, to London carrying tobacco leaf wrecked near Efford, Bude. Some of her fixtures and cargo were salvaged and sold at Bude.
- 21 December – Price(United Kingdom) wrecked near Bude Haven while bound for Chichester from Waterford with a cargo of beef, butter, lard and oats. A second report says she was driven ashore at her home port of Padstow.
- unknown date – Mary Ann wrecked near Porthleven.

== 1811–1820 ==
=== 1811 ===
- 1 August – Expedition wrecked on Manacle Point.
- March – Providence (United Kingdom) wrecked on Manacle Point (or The Manacles). She was on a voyage from Plymouth, Devon, to Amelia Island, East Florida.
- unknown date – Bloodhound wrecked at Harlyn Bay

=== 1812 ===
- 20 March – the diary of a fisherman recorded "This night seven vessels which were in the Mount Road riding, parted and was driven on shore. Three to the Westward ... are an entire wreck ... out of which four or five men and a boy was drowned".

=== 1813 ===
- 27 March – Island wrecked at Leggan Cove, Manacle Point.

=== 1814 ===
- 13 January – troop transport ship Queen wrecked off Trefusis Point, Mylor returning from the Peninsular War with loss of 369 lives. The survivors were 99 (including 85 soldiers).
- 9 December – Atalanta (Bremen) was wrecked near Porthleven while carrying a cargo of salt. All five crew and three locals attempting to save the crew drowned.
- 19 December – De Vrouw Sara Johanna with a mixed cargo of cocoa, Spanish wool, cinnamon and hides was wrecked on the rocks west of Porthleven. Her crew and some of the cargo survived.
- unknown date – The Mentor a West Indiaman from Martinique driven on the Chyandour rocks. Only one of the 25 crew survived.

=== 1815 ===
- 19 October – ″A most stormy night, when the Dutch East Indiaman was wrecked in Mount's Bay″.
- 24 October – While bound from Bordeaux to Rouen with a cargo of wine a French sloop was wrecked on Loe Bar
- 27 November – Dolphin wrecked at Godrevy Cove, Manacle Point.
- 5–6 December – an unnamed galliot Netherlands was wrecked on the Moulds, near Padstow with the loss of all the crew.

=== 1816 ===
- 14 July – Jonge Anthony while bound for Amsterdam from Lisbon with a cargo of salt, tea and cocoa wrecked on Loe Bar. All the crew managed to get ashore.
- 16 July – Scilly packet the Lord Howe (United Kingdom) hit a rock off Kemyel Point, beyond Mousehole. A fishing fleet nearby took off the passengers, crew and most of the cargo.
- 15 September – twelve gun schooner HMS Whiting (Royal Navy) on her way to patrol the Irish Sea took refuge from a gale and tried to enter Padstow harbour without a pilot. She grounded on the Doom Bar on an ebb tide The officer in charge Lt John Jackson was court–martialled for negligence and three of the crew received fifty lashes for desertion.

=== 1817 ===
- 4 January – London brig Resolution bound from Porto came ashore close to Porthleven with a cargo of port wine and oranges.
- 19 and 20 January – a storm with hurricane-force winds caused damage to property from Plymouth to Land's End. At Penzance two ships sank within the harbour, a third filled with water and a fourth broke her moorings and went ashore. At Polperro thirty boats and two seines ″shared in the common calamity and exposed the unhappy sufferers to distress from which the industry of years can scarcely be expected to relieve them″.
- 20 January – Cherokee-class brig-sloop HMS Jasper (Royal Navy) was wrecked during hurricane-force winds while running for safety in Plymouth Sound. She went ashore at either Rame Head or Bear's Head, Mount Batten, with the death of 65 people.
- 24 January – Ten drowned when the L'Hameçon was wrecked near Porthleven. She was carrying wine from Marseille to Havre de Grace.
- February – three men from an unrecorded shipwreck buried at Mullion.
- 20 March – brig Mary wrecked at Fassel Geaver Cove near Godrevy during a northerly gale. All crew saved. A number of people described as ″Camborne Miners″ were committed to trial at the Assize after stealing the anchors, food and clothing.
- unknown date – sloop Dove carrying a cargo of culm (coal) from Neath to Plymouth wrecked near Porthleven. Two drowned.

=== 1818 ===
- April – Brig Victoria (Sweden) with a cargo of wine driven ashore. Looters swarmed on board but driven away by the Penrith Yeomanry.
- William wrecked on the Manacles.

=== 1819 ===
- 20 February (first report) – Bristol sloop Friends wrecked at Bude Haven with the loss of the Master.
- 18 or 25 November – Exeter ship Endeavor with coal wrecked on the cliffs of St Ginnis (St Gennys) with the loss of the three crew. Her fate was watched by hundreds of people on the cliff who were unable to offer assistance. Scheduled Ancient Monument no. 905227.
- 19 December – 171-ton Montreal Packet wrecked on Loe Bar while bound for London from Tarragona with a cargo of nuts. Her Captain and crew of six were drowned and buried in Sithney churchyard two days later.
- Isles of Scilly packet Lord Howe sank off the Runnelstone.

=== 1820 ===
- Idea lost off Nare Head, The Lizard.

== 1821–1830 ==
=== 1821 ===
- 4 March – Peggy bound for London from Lisbon with a cargo of oranges was wrecked on rocks to the west of Porthleven. Boxes of oranges were raised to the cliff top using Henry Trengrouse's apparatus.
- 30 April – Swansea brig Birmingham (United Kingdom) struck the Rundlestone when bound for Le Havre from her home port with eight aboard. She sank within five minutes and only two survived.
- 27 August – the Carmarthen Packet with tin–plate and slate from Carmarthen to London struck a shoal to the north of the Runnelstone and sank almost immediately. The crew were picked up by the Regent and landed at Penzance three days later.
- Teat's Hill wrecked at the entrance to Carrick Roads, near the Black Rock.

=== 1823 ===
- May – Plymouth ship Peace bound for Liverpool from her home port with malt struck the Runnelstone. With the help of local boatmen she was beached on the sands at Whitsand Bay, repaired and sailed to Penzance.
- 9 October – Sarah Jane wrecked on the Manacles.
- 23 October – a French brig carrying iron and coal struck the Shoaler Stone near Godrevy Island with the loss of two men.

=== 1824 ===
- 28 January – the Vrow Gesina on voyage from Lisbon to London wrecked on the coast of Poundstock parish. Scheduled Ancient Monument no. 1105243.
- 22–23 February – a "hurricane" from the south and south–south–east caused much damage including the top of the lighthouse at Penzance and part of the pier, boats in the harbour were driven ashore and in some cases dismasted. Approximately a dozen boats in Mousehole and Newlyn destroyed and others damaged.
- 22–23 February – a vessel in the bay near Mousehole wrecked with the loss of her five crew.
- 22–23 February – the Celia ( Sweden) of Stockholm driven ashore at Lamorna Cove.
- 27 April – the first ever silver medals were awarded to William Rowe of Porthleven and John Freeman of Gunwalloe by the Royal National Lifeboat Institution, at their first meeting on 10 July 1824 for the rescue of collier brig Olive, when she was driven into Mount's Bay by bad weather and went ashore near Halzephron cliffs. William Rowe swam through the breaking waves with a rope tied around his waist and with the help of John Freeman and 24 men on shore saved the Captain, his sister and all six crew. The 24 men were rewarded with a share of £30.
- 26 December – the Ability (United Kingdom) from Cork for Penzance and watched by hundreds of people was wrecked, with the loss of her crew, near Bude.

=== 1826 ===
- 5 February – ketch Ida (Sweden) bound from Messina for Stockholm with a cargo of oranges wrecked on Porthleven beach near the newly completed harbour. Three crew members drowned and the captain and mate saved by a line from the shore. Waves breaking over nearby Loe Bar were an indication of the ferocity of the storm and a 14-year-old girl was swept into Loe Pool while crossing the bar and drowned as she was rushing to site of the wreck.
- 12 April – the Giraffa (or Geraffa) (United Kingdom) of Scarborough carrying oats from Cork to London was driven onshore in Bude Bay during a north–west gale with the loss of the ship's boy. Scheduled Ancient Monument no. 905276.
- September – Teignmouth schooner Fanny (United Kingdom) hit a shoal near the Runnelstone and sank. The crew was saved by HM Cutter Dove (United Kingdom) which was replacing the nearby buoy.
- 9 October – Irish passenger vessel Jane foundered eight miles west of Bude. Scheduled Ancient Monument no. 905485.

=== 1828 ===
- April – brig Albion wrecked near Penzance and crew saved by the rocket apparatus and by a gig.
- 1 May – Auspicious wrecked off Dean Point, near the Manacles.
- 29 October – sloop Anna Maria (United Kingdom) of Padstow sank near Porthleven when her tow rope to the brig Oakwell broke. She was carrying roofing slates from Port Gaverne to Truro.

=== 1829 ===
- 4 January – the crew drowned when an unknown English vessel was wrecked at Godrevy.
- 1 February – Ringdove wrecked on the Manacles.
- 3 December – sloop Polyblank (United Kingdom) of Dartmouth with a cargo of coal from Newport hit the Runnelstone and foundered. The crew managed to launch the ship's boat and were found on the beach at Lamorna Cove, the next morning.

=== 1830 ===
- December – three foreign ships were lost in Veryan Bay during a storm. Shortly after Trinity House decided to build a tower on Gribben Head to distinguish it from The Dodman and St Anthony's Head.
- 5 December – brig Bon Pere (France) while en route from Guadeloupe to Le Havre with sugar, was wrecked on Towan Beach while trying to weather Zone Point and reach Falmouth. The crew of ten survived thanks to Lt William James RN of St Mawes who swam through the surf to bring a rope ashore.
- 5 (or 6) December – Brothers (United Kingdom) was driven ashore and wrecked at Coverack. She was on a voyage from Bridgwater, Somerset, to Hull, Yorkshire; her crew were rescued.
- 6 December – brig Bacchus (United Kingdom) wrecked on the Gull Rock, in Gerrans Bay with the loss of all hands.
- 6 December – galiot Catherine Margaretha (Denmark) was driven ashore and wrecked at Portholland. She was on a voyage from Liverpool to Hamburg.
- 6 December – Despatch (United Kingdom): driven ashore at Penzance and later refloated.
- 6 December – brig Ebenezer (United Kingdom) driven ashore at Penzance. Her crew were rescued. She was refloated on 13 December and taken in to Penzance.
- 6 December – schooner Eleanor (United Kingdom) driven ashore and wrecked at either Newlyn or Penzance.
- 6 December – brig Experiment (Norway) wrecked in Cawsand Bay. She was on a voyage from Rochefort, Charente-Maritime to Kristiansand.
- 6 December – brig Hawke (United Kingdom) driven ashore and wrecked near Maenporth with the loss of all hands. She was on a voyage from Cardiff, Glamorgan, to London.
- 6 December – Henry (United Kingdom) driven ashore at Penzance and later refloated.
- 6 December – Industry (United Kingdom) driven ashore at Penzance. She was on a voyage from Lisbon, Portugal to London.
- 6 December – Kingfisher (United Kingdom): The ship sank at Penzance.
- 6 December – La Mayenne (France): The schooner was driven ashore and wrecked on The Towans, Cornwall. Her crew were rescued. She was on a voyage from Cette, Hérault to Rouen, Seine-Maritime.
- 6 December – brig Matilda and Susan (United Kingdom) driven ashore and wrecked 3 nautical miles (5.6 km) east of Helford with the loss of all hands. She was on a voyage from Plymouth, Devon, to St. Andero, Spain.
- 6 December – Mothers (United Kingdom) wrecked near The Lizard. She was on a voyage from Bridgwater to Hull; her crew were rescued.
- 6 December – schooner Resolution (United Kingdom) driven ashore at Penzance while on a voyage from Livorno, Grand Duchy of Tuscany to Leith, Lothian.
- 6 December – brig St. Nicholas (Russia) driven ashore and wrecked between Deadman's Point and St Anthony's Point. She was on a voyage from Saint Petersburg to the Mediterranean.
- 6 December – schooner Susan and Matilda (United Kingdom) driven ashore and wrecked at Maenporth with the loss of all hands.
- 6 December – Tobacconist (United Kingdom) foundered in the English Channel off Portholland.

== 1831–1840 ==
=== 1831 ===
- end of October – brig Vigilant (United Kingdom) of Whitby with a cargo of timber from Richebucto, New Brunswick to Hull was stranded on a reef at high water. The crew climbed over the rocks to the shore on the ebb tide. Vigilant went to pieces on the next tide.

=== 1832 ===
- cargo vessel wrecked in Bude bay.
- Unknown date Ocean (United Kingdom wrecked at Watergate Bay
- Unknown date Duchess of Somerset (United Kingdom wrecked at the north end of Watergate Bay

=== 1833 ===
- 7 February – Isles of Scilly smack John and Mary was wrecked 100 yards east of Porthleven pier while bound from Cork to Plymouth.
- 27 October – the crew of the Neptunus attempted to row ashore near Porthleven when their ship lost her mast in a gale. All six lost their lives.

=== 1836 ===
- early February – the stern of the St Ives boat Fanny was washed onto the shore near Newquay. The crew lost their lives.
- 4 February – a sloop was dismasted off Land's End. The Eliza Richards passed within a quarter of a mile but could not offer any assistance.
- 7 February – Paul washed up onto the beach at Gwithian. Four other ships were wrecked (whereabouts undisclosed).
- early March – unnamed barge carrying timber foundered between Mevagissey and Falmouth.
- 9 March (or 2 March) – Fowey boat Venus foundered a mile and half to the east of her home port. All three crew lost.
- 27 March – brig Traveller of Aberdeen from Port-au-Prince awaiting orders was driven ashore onto Trefusis Point. Part of her cargo of coffee, cotton and timber was salvaged. Schooners Lavinia, Killigrew and Ceres also driven ashore.
- 27 March – sloop Susan of Plymouth driven ashore on the Helford River.
- 27 March – Two smacks from Brixham with the same name, Anne, driven ashore on the beach near Newlyn. Sixteen ″lognail driving boats″ parted their cables, seven of them became total wrecks. The Providence was knocked to pieces by the Susan, whilst the Sally, Ocean, Agenoria and Lord Wellington all driven onto the harbour beach with bulwarks and rails broken.
- 2 April – brig Ocean of Newport entered Padstow harbour in a strong NW gale on a heavy sea. She hit the sloop Margaretta and Esther and capsized with the loss of all six crew.
- 10 April – schooner Rashleigh of St Ives and the Europa of Mecklenburg collided, approximately three leagues south of Penzance, whilst on opposite tacks. The Europa picked up the crew of the Rashleigh which was carrying coal.
- 18 September – schooner La Ostendia (Belgium) carrying salt, tin and wool from Liverpool for her home port of Ostend foundered approximately twelve leagues WSW of Lundy Island. The crew of six were landed at St Ives the next day.
- 10 October – ″The whole of our Southern coast, having been visited by heavy gales of wind, with rain, for several nights past; and on Monday night it blew a perfect gale. Some of the fishing boats in Goran Haven are seriously injured – one completely knocked to pieces.″
- 12 October – ″On Wednesday and Wednesday night, the storm was truly awful″. A barge collecting oarweed from Mylor sank off Bar Point. A small boat with two men in it was lost in the Fal.
- 12 October – a seine boat together with its nets sank at Mullion.
- 13 October – the Padstow ferry capsized drowning the three passengers.
- 17 October – Exeter schooner Thomas and Nancy was run down by the Dartmouth smack Rebecca which brought the crew into Padstow.
- 26 October – schooner Progress of Beaumaris went ashore at Bude. The crew of four were saved.
- 27 October – schooner Caroline wrecked at the entrance to Falmouth Harbour. Sixty tons of copper ore was salvaged.
- 29 October – a schooner was seen to sink off Bude in heavy seas.
- 2 November – schooner Gallen of Cork lost at Portreath whilst in ballast.
- 19 November – the Longships lighthouse boat sank in Gwavas Lake.
- 23 November – whilst entering Padstow harbour the smack Britannia of Jersey collided with a schooner. Three men from the smack survived.
- 29 November – sloop Emma driven ashore near St Mawes Castle. Other ships were driven onto the beach at Falmouth during hurricane-force winds.
- schooner Jane sank whilst attempting to enter Padstow harbour. She had lost her main boom, foretop sail and boat. Three of the crew were saved by the Dewdrop.

=== 1837 ===
- April – Newmanly wrecked near the Manacles.
- July – timber-laden ship Lockwood was lost during a gale off Marazion, between Chapel Rock and St Michael's Mount. All the crew were saved.
- unknown date – the Riot Act was read by the Rev. Mr. Buller of St Just after looting of the Le Landois (France) by a ″drunken mob of over 4,000 people″ when she went ashore in Whitesand Bay near Gribba Point with a cargo of wines, cordials, cotton, velvet, tobacco and brandy.

=== 1838 ===
- 20 January – A Neapolitan vessel wrecked at Polurrian in Mount's Bay with the loss of all hands. Eleven bodies found and buried in Mullion.
- 20 April – 170-ton East Indiaman brig Neptune with a valuable cargo and nine crew lost at Godrevy.
- 6 May – Osiris wrecked on the Manacles.
- 20 June – an unnamed 150-ton (possibly) Spanish–built ship was stranded on the shore near Mullion. There was no sign of a cargo or crew just some clothing and a few firearms. The remains of a boy and man together with parts of a ship's boat was later washed ashore.
- 21 September – brig Affleck ran aground near Lowland Point, St Keverne.
- 4 October – Industry sprung a leak in heavy winds while in ballast from Penzance to Swansea and sank 50 miles (80 km) leeward of St Ives.
- 122-ton schooner Rival (United Kingdom) on voyage from Bristol to Poole grounded on Porthminster beach with a cargo of salt. All five crew survived.
- Ranger wrecked in Carrick Roads off Castle Point.
- Rose wrecked on the Manacles.

=== 1839 ===
- 18 January – brig Leander wrecked in Coverack Cove.
- 3 May – the barque Parmelia sank in St Catherines Dock, Cremyll after catching fire. For nine years she transported convicts to Australia.
- 18 July – the crew and boy of the Perseverance died when she was wrecked on Loe Bar. She was carrying coal from Wales to Truro.
- end of September – brig Albion (United Kingdom) of Exeter wrecked in Whitesand Bay.
- unknown date – Pictou wrecked on the Manacles.
- unknown date – the fishing fleet of Mullion Cove was wrecked in a sudden gale while anchored off the beach.

=== 1840 ===
- 27 February – 160-ton brig Robert of Beaumaris carrying slates from Liverpool to London. All the crew were saved.
- 17 September – body found from an unknown shipwreck.

== 1841–1850 ==
=== 1841 ===
- 5 March Brilliant (United Kingdom wrecked at Watergate Bay. The schooner from Penzance, Jenkins master, was returning homeward bound from Boscastle with slates. Despite a rescue bid from the Newquay schooner Sisters, all crew were lost.
- 19 March – a foreign galliot struck the Runnelstone and was driven ashore at St Levan with none of the crew seen. Two local men were arrested on a charge of plundering the wreck although the cargo of dyewood, sumach, cans of naptha and wool was ruined, and the ship had broken up. The Runnelstone buoy had been lost in a gale a few days previously leaving the reef unmarked.
- 22 March – The schooner Mary Stuart of Cardiff was dismasted and in distress off Praa Sands in Mounts Bay. Blowing a gale of wind from the southward, and it being momentarily expected that she would be driven to destruction, Lieutenant H.S Smith RN with four men belonging to the coastguard, and one man from Prussia Cove, went out in a boat to rescue the fellow creatures from peril, but melancholy to relate, the boat was overwhelmed by a heavy sea, and Lieutenant Smith and the whole of his crew, after swimming for a considerable time in sight of their wives and children, were dashed against the rocks, and all perished.
- 30 October – schooner Eliza Williams carrying oats from Waterford to London hit the Runnelstone and finally sank three miles to the east of the reef in 35 fathoms of water. Her crew were rescued by Guerilla a pilot cutter based at Penzance.

=== 1842 ===
- ship lost on Black Rock, Crackington Haven, with the loss of all eight crew.

=== 1843 ===
- 10 January – a St Ives schooner sank under the cliffs of Morwenstow with the loss of her crew.
- 15 January – St Ives schooner Phoenix wrecked at Stanbury, Morwenstow en route from Gloucester to Plymouth with the loss of all lives.
- 15 or 16 January – East Indiaman Jessie Logan (United Kingdom) en route from Calcutta to Liverpool with cotton and wool onboard wrecked at Willapark, Boscastle. She was struck by heavy seas on the 13th which removed her poop and stove in her stern. The crew abandoned ship on the 15th and were picked up by the Lynx, arriving in Cork on the 18th. Scheduled Ancient Monument no. 905413.
- 15 or 16 January – a galliot from Schiedam, the Elizabeth Aletta (Netherlands) carrying rock salt, driven onto the sands at Crackington Haven. Some of her crew of twelve climbed the rigging and were lost when it collapsed into the sea. Several bodies are interred in St Gennys churchyard. A Scheduled Ancient Monument no. 1192970.
- 26 June – Helene wrecked off Dean Point, St Keverne
- July – the Trinity House vessel Vestal was surveying the coast at Trevose Head for a lighthouse when the ship's boat with two of the Elder Brethren aboard capsized in a heavy sea. The eight crew were saved but the two Brethren drowned.
- 7 September – brig Caledonia (United Kingdom) with grain was lost at Sharpnose Point, Morwenstow. She was on a year-long voyage from Rio and Odesa, and was two days away from her destination of Gloucester when she wrecked on Sharpnose Point, Morwenstow with the loss of all the crew bar one. One of the memorials in Morwenstow churchyard was the white figurehead of the Caledonia. The captain and crew are buried in the churchyard. In 2004 the figurehead was removed for conservation and placed in the Church of St Morwenna and St John the Baptist in 2008. A replica is in the churchyard.
- 17 October – several wrecks occurred along the north Cornish coast during a severe gale, including three vessels ashore at Widemouth Bay. The Royal Cornwall Gazette commented ".... shows the necessity of a Lighthouse on Trevose Head to point out to mariners their situation and prevent their getting into the Bays, from which they can seldom work out again ....".
- 17 October – all six crew drowned when the Fishguard brig Hope (United Kingdom) went ashore between Port Quin and Pentire Point.
- 17 October – schooner Ceres (United Kingdom) of Waterford on voyage from Portsmouth to Wales sank on the Greenaway rocks, near Polzeath. Her crew were saved.
- 17 October – Letitia (United Kingdom) of Padstow was stranded in the River Camel but made it to her home port.
- 28 October – Alonzo (United Kingdom) of Stockton en route from South Wales for Hamburg with iron came ashore at Bude. The crew took to the ship's boat which capsized with the loss of all hands and came ashore at Stanbury Mouth.
- 28 October – brig Favorite (United Kingdom) of Sunderland, in the company of Alonzo, grounded near Bude breakwater while en route from Cardiff to Rotterdam with iron.
- the Emma carrying coals from Newport to Plymouth hit the Stones Reef in St Ives Bay. With water in her hold she tried to make for St Ives and grounded at the entrance to the harbour.

=== 1844 ===
- 23 July – while carrying copper ore from Plymouth to Wales the schooner Reward hit the Shoaler Stone. The crew escaped in her boat.
- 10 October – during an exercise the unnamed Bude Lifeboat ( Royal National Lifeboat Institution) capsized when the steering oar broke followed by four on the port side. Two crew drowned.
- 11 October – while in ballast and bound for Pentewan from Cherbourg the St Louis lost her mast near the Wolf Rock and eventually wrecked near Porthleven pier.

=== 1845 ===
- January – a ship hit the Runnelstone and carried away the stump of the beacon which had been fixed in place on 27 June 1843. The beacon's six inch diameter wrought–iron mast had been broken two feet above its socket in a gale the previous October.
- 5 June – Ellen wrecked near Porthleven while bound for London from Wales with coal. Six drowned.
- 23 December – the brig Dorothy of Sunderland was caught in a NNE gale and was seen heading for the shore to the east of Godrevy Island. She sailed between the island and the headland where she hit rocks twice, disabling her rudder and eventually ran ashore just to the west of the Gwithian river. Her crew escaped at low water. She was carrying railway iron from Cardiff to Goole.

=== 1846 ===
- end of June or July – a ship was observed to hit the beacon on the Runnelstone without causing it any damage. Some of the ship's timbers were driven in.
- 21 October – snow Eliza of Liverpool was stranded under Stowe Cliffs at ″Warren Gutter″. She was heading for Valparaiso carrying a general cargo worth £80,000 including wine, cloth and tea. One man was shot and wounded during the plundering of her cargo.
- 22 October – a British West or East Indiaman stranded at Marsland Mouth during what was described as ″One of the severest gales that has been known for a great many years on the north coast of Cornwall .... and continued from the 20th to the 23rd. Some of the crew was saved. Report of a vessel which sank near Bude may refer to the Indiaman or the Eliza (21 October).
- 20 November – Elizabeth (Norway) of Bergen wrecked at Gunwalloe beach. The Master and three of the crew saved by breeches-buoy but two men and the boy were lost. Five crew drowned according to the Royal Cornwall Gazette.
- The Good Samaritan wrecked on Bedruthan Steps.

=== 1847 ===
- 16 March – 324-ton Goole brig Defiance (United Kingdom) envoyage from London to Galway with a general cargo hit the Runnelstone and drifted towards the Brisons. Part of the vessel, along with flour and meal was salvaged at Priests Cove. The fourteen crew abandoned her in the jolly, shortly after she struck, and were picked up four miles NW of the Brisons by the Salcombe schooner Aid and landed at St Ives.
- 15 October – barque Ins (Russian-Finlander) embayed and wrecked near Poljew in Mount's Bay.
- unknown date – sloop Dove (United Kingdom) of Falmouth driven ashore at Gunwalloe with the loss of the captain and crew, a short time after 15 October.

=== 1848 ===
- 9 April – a small schooner ran into the Stones reef at Godrevy with the loss of one man. The other three crew managed to row to the Hayle Bar and land nearby.

=== 1849 ===
- Mary wrecked on the west side of Pendennis Point.
- Venus wrecked on the Manacles.

=== 1850 ===
- 21 November – the crew drowned when the Queen of London envoyage from Cardiff to Italy with tin-plate and iron sank near Godrevy.
- 24 November – the Windrush from Malaga was wrecked near Porthleven. The 5 crew members were all drowned and the wreck quickly became matchwood. It was carrying a cargo which included a large quantity of lemons and raisins and was recalled as the "Fruit wreck".
- unknown date – Rosanna wrecked off Dean Point.
- Unknown date Lord Duncan (United Kingdom wrecked at the north end of Watergate Bay

== 1851–1860 ==
=== 1851 ===
- 11 January – 250-ton brigantine New Commercial (United Kingdom) of Whitby on the Brisons. The captain and his wife were rescued from the rocks of Little Brison after over 24 hours of failed attempts, but Mrs Sanderson died of exposure before she could get ashore. One other crewman survived after building a makeshift craft from wreckage, drifting into Whitsand Bay and being picked up by the local boat Grace.
- 23 September – St Ives schooner Friends (United Kingdom) carrying coal from Wales to Penzance struck the Runnelstone and sank immediately; the crew escaped in their boat.

=== 1852 ===
- February – galliot Dindrina (Netherlands) of Veendam carrying linseed hit the Runnelstone and after being abandoned was towed to St Mary's by the schooner Allegro. The Dindrina's crew landed at Falmouth,
- 28 April – smack Hope (United Kingdom) of Salcombe with culm (fine–grained coal waste) from Neath for Totnes hit the Stones reef at Godrevy and foundered. The crew escaped in the ship's boat.
- 12 August – schooner Primrose (United Kingdom) of Truro lost her bowsprit and masts in a heavy sea. She was heading for Neath, from her home port with copper ore and went aground at Higher Sharpnose Point.

=== 1853 ===
- 28 December – schooner Mount Charles (United Kingdom) of Fowey bound for Hayle sank immediately after hitting the Stones reef at Godrevy. The crew escaped.

=== 1854 ===
- 21 January – barque John Taylor lost near Park Head.
- 11 November – 525-ton screw-driven steamship Nile (United Kingdom) hit The Stones reef and sank. All hands were lost and pressure was put on Trinity House to build a lighthouse on the reef.
- 20 December – Swift (United Kingdom) with a cargo of coal and iron was driven onto a sandbank during a gale while seeking shelter at St Ives. All the crew were saved. During the same storm the Concord carrying a cargo of iron was also driven onto the same sandbank. Five of the six crew were saved but the Master was drowned.
- 20 December – New Jane (United Kingdom during a Northerly gale, the Exeter Schooner was wrecked near Newquay, Cornwall and started to break up with her bow sprit over the rocks. Lifeboatman, Mr Pierce climbed out over the rocks and helped the crew to escape over the bow sprit but, tragically, was washed off the rocks when he was carrying the ship's boy. He recovered himself with great difficulty but the boy was lost"
- Unknown date Chester (United Kingdom wrecked at Newquay

=== 1855 ===
- 26 February – brig Marian (France) was found on the shore five miles north of Bude. Also known as Marina, Maria and Marina, she was carrying alabaster. Scheduled Ancient Monument no. 905581.
- March – brig Ampulla (United Kingdom) foundered in a NW gale and was last seen 2–3 miles off Dizzard Head with the loss of the eight crew. Scheduled Ancient Monument no. 1108413.
- 3 May – barque John hit one of the eastern rocks of the Manacles in fine weather. The Captain (Edwin Rawle) forbade the lowering of boats and 196 lives were lost. He was later found guilty of gross negligence, but acquitted on the charge of manslaughter.

=== 1856 ===
- 11 March – the Desdemona (United States) of New Orleans was said to have had a lucky escape after striking the Stones reef in St Ives Bay.
- 22 March – brigantine Ernest carrying coal from Llanelli to France hit the Stones reef, she managed to reach St Ives.
- 6 May – the first (unnamed) Sennen Cove lifeboat, in her only rescue attempt, towed the Charles Adolphe (France) of La Rochelle to Penzance after she collided with an unnamed vessel in a south–east gale off Land's End.
- 7 May – schooner Endeavour (United Kingdom) was wrecked between Gribben Head and Polkerris, Cornwall with the loss of all three crew. She was on a voyage from Dartmouth, Devon to Charlestown, Cornwall.
- 22 July – emigrant iron steamer Zebra was a total wreck on the Lizard. The passengers were probably picked up by Falmouth tugs.
- 5 September – 77 drowned when Cherubim (United States) and Ocean Home (United States) collided off Lizard Point.
- 29 September – much wreckage seen in St Ives Bay thought to be from a French vessel.

=== 1857 ===
- 14 to 17 June – wreckage including part of a ship's mast and bowsprit washed up at St Ives from a ship thought to have been lost on the Stones reef.
- 20 June – the schooner Dawn with a cargo of coal sunk about three miles off Porthleven.
- 23 June – Naais wrecked under Morvah Cliff.
- 19 or 20 October – the schooner-brigantine Mary Welch while on voyage from Cardiff to Hayle with a cargo of coal was wrecked on the Stones at Godrevy with the loss of all the crew. A temporary floating light was placed on the Stones and Godrevy Lighthouse was built on the island for £7000 following an outcry over the loss of lives.

=== 1858 ===
- 7 February – an unknown vessel wrecked on the outer rocks at Godrevy.
- 24 or 25 May – sloop Temperance (United Kingdom) while carrying coal wrecked at Marsland Mouth in a NNW gale, with the loss of her three crew.
- 17 September – Glencoe (United Kingdom) of Whitby embayed and wrecked at Polurrian in Mount's Bay.
- 17 September – Mary (United Kingdom) of Bridgwater went ashore at Polurrian. The crew survived except one boy.
- 22 September – schooner Chester embayed and foundered in Mount's Bay. The crew landed at Mullion Cove in the ship's boat.
- 7 October – schooner Hopewell in Mount's Bay.
- 19 October – Gezina Beerta (Netherlands) sprung a leak off Land's End but made it to Porthleven where she was beached. Some of her cargo of railway track was salvaged. She refloated but wrecked near the pier.

=== 1859 ===
- 21 January – government transport ship, the 740-ton steamer Czar (United Kingdom) of Hull wrecked on the Vrogue Rocks, off Bass Point. She was taking ammunition and uniforms to Malta. The coastguard from Cadgwith and Church Cove saved some of the crew but the captain and his family drowned. Following the tragedy Mrs Agar of Lanhydrock donated money to buy the first Lizard Lifeboat (Anna Maria) which was stationed later in the year.
- 25 (or 26) June – a schooner was driven ashore, above the spring high tide mark, in Par harbour during ″very considerable oscillations of the sea″. A second schooner's hawsers parted and she was driven out of the harbour by the current and went ashore nearby.
- 30 July – the schooner Johanna (United Kingdom) sprung a leak off Penzance while carrying coal from Swansea to Algiers, forcing the crew to take to the ship's boat.
- 25 October – two unknown ships lost on the Stones reef during a storm known as the Royal Charter Storm.
- 7 November – sailing ship Chincas (United States) was driven onto Loe Bar when her anchor cable parted in high winds. She was bound for Rio de Janeiro from Liverpool with 3000 tons of coal and was the largest sailing ship to be wrecked on the bar. Four of the crew of 35 lost their lives.
- Irish schooner Beverley wrecked on the shore one mile south–west of Upton Cliff, near Bude. Her crew and one female passenger were rescued by the rocket apparatus and her captain jumped overboard and reached the shore. Scheduled Ancient Monument no. 905607.
- brig Oscar ( Sweden) was driven ashore at St Mawes in a severe storm. She was unharmed and refloated.

=== 1860 ===
- 13 February – the Sunderland brig Belford (United Kingdom), from Rouen to Cardiff in ballast, was wrecked on the Cowloe off Sennen Cove, becoming a total wreck.
- 5 April –the Liverpool barque Alceste (United Kingdom) was carrying coal from Cardiff to Southampton struck a sunken rock, south of the Longships and became a total loss. The crew escaped in the ship's boat.
- 5 April – 113-ton Penzance schooner John Purdie (United Kingdom) in ballast from St Michael's Mount to Llanelly struck a sunken rock near the Runnelstone and sank. The crew escaped in the ship's boat.
- 18 April – 263-ton brig Helena (Norway) of Bergen with ice for Cardiff hit the Runnelstone. Despite taking on water she was towed to Penzance by a passing steamer.
- 8 September – the Sunderland Orphan Friend (United Kingdom) sprung a leak and foundered off the Land's End while carrying coal from Cardiff to London. The crew escaped in the ship's boat.
- 4 November – the Truro brigantine Happy Couple (United Kingdom) was a total loss off Mullion while carrying coal from Neath to Devoran. The crew escaped in the ship's boat.
- schooner Cezimpra (United Kingdom) ran aground on the sands at the back of the Bude breakwater. Her crew escaped via a line thrown to the shore.

=== 1864 ===
- Heroine (United Kingdom wrecked at Newquay

== 1871–1880 ==
=== 1871 ===
- 10 March – in thick fog the 17,000-ton Carlic hit the Desire (PZ 335) which was fishing off the Lizard. All but one of her seven crew killed.
- 26 May – Irish schooner Gannet (United Kingdom) bound from Merseyside to Antwerp with a cargo of cotton bales and salt ran aground on the east side of Gurnard's Head.
- yacht Gitana (United Kingdom) slipped her moorings at Crackington Haven and was wrecked on nearby rocks.

=== 1872 ===
- 1 February – 698-ton barque Manitobah ( Canada) of Yarmouth, Nova Scotia wrecked on the Wolf Rock with the loss of thirteen lives. She was in ballast from Le Havre to Briton Ferry when she mistook the Wolf Rock for St Agnes.
- 14 September – two barques the Marianna and the Nuova Raffalino (Kingdom of Italy) both of Genoa sailed from the Far East with cargoes of rice. The met off the Scillies, lost each other in fog, and met again when the fog cleared, wrecked on the same rocks at Lizard Point. Both crews made it safely ashore in their boats.
- 22 November – 180-ton schooner Albion (United Kingdom) of Littlehampton, in ballast from Penzance and unable to make Par in a gale, wrecked on the shore one mile to the east of Looe. Two of the crew made it ashore.
- 23 November – twelve drowned when the 299-ton Loch Leven Flower (United Kingdom) of Sunderland carrying wheat from the Black Sea to Falmouth wrecked on rocks near Halzephron.
- 23 November – 450-ton barque Luigina Reanchette (Kingdom of Italy) of Genoa envoyage from Montevideo to Antwerp with tallow and hides was driven ashore near Lamorna Cove in a SW gale. Eight bodies were washed ashore. The third Genoan ship to be lost off Cornwall this year.
- 2 December – there was no loss of life when the Padstow schooner Peace (United Kingdom) with barley from her home port to Cork hit the Runnelstone.

=== 1873 ===
- 26 January – brig Otto (Norway) of Moss 58 days out from Bahia to Falmouth wrecked. The Penzance lifeboat Richard Lewis ( Royal National Lifeboat Institution) rescued eight men, a dog and a pig at the third attempt, Wrecked again in 1888.
- 2 February – easterly, hurricane strength winds wrecked the schooners Rose (United Kingdom) and Treaty (United Kingdom) while the lifeboat was oncall off the Eastern Green, Penzance to aid the schooner Marie Emile (France) which was heading for her home port of Lorient with a cargo of coal from Cardiff. All four saved on board.
- 2 March – the Boyne, a 690-ton iron–hulled barque, carrying sugar from Semarang to Falmouth wrecked under Angrouse Cliff near Mullion Cove.
- 1 October – 99-ton schooner Elizabeth Ann (United Kingdom) of Penzance bound for Cardiff in ballast wrecked at Lamorna Cove, with no loss of life.
- 26 November – schooner Coquette (France) wrecked near Porthleven.
- schooner Ellen Martin (United Kingdom) beached on Summerlease Point Cliffs whilst attempting to enter Bude Harbour. Her crew was taken off by breeches buoy and the ship's figurehead was in the captain's garden for many years.

=== 1874 ===
- 4 May – Night Templor wrecked on the Stags at the Lizard while carrying wheat from San Francisco.
- August – barque Atlantic (United Kingdom) foundered twenty miles NW off Trevose Head with the loss of her crew of twenty. Scheduled Monument no. 905812.
- 22 September – schooner La Soudre bound for Cardiff ran ashore on Loe Bar following the loss of her sails in a gale. Both her crew and the cargo of pit wood was saved.
- 20 October – the 44-ton sloop William and Anne (United Kingdom), while in ballast and bound for Plymouth, was hit by a sudden gust of wind and failed to clear the pier at Porthleven. The uninsured wreck was valued at £250.
- 12 November – the 345-ton iron screw, three masted schooner Vulture (United Kingdom) took a route inside the Runnelstone while carrying coal from Cardiff to Rouen. With the aim of keeping to quiet water to quicken her journey she scraped against the Leows (or Lee Oar) stone, near the Runnelstone and with six feet of water inside her made it to Penzance harbour. (See 1893 as well)
- November/December – the Bude schooner Nancy (United Kingdom) was wrecked with the loss of all three crew during a storm at Welcombe Mouth, Morwenstow.
- 8 December – while carrying wheat from Taganrog to Dublin the Diane (Austria-Hungary) was lost at Gunwalloe Church Cove.
- 28 August – smack Josephine (United Kingdom) sank during a gale 1.5 miles off Trevose Head. The Board of Trade considered her to be overloaded with 86 tons of coal from Cardiff. All four crew lost their lives.
- Unknown date smack Friends (United Kingdom wrecked at the North end of Watergate Bay

=== 1875 ===
- 26 January – steamer Caen (United Kingdom) of Cardiff ran ashore in fog at Green Lane, The Lizard.
- 3 May – steamship Kynance (United Kingdom) while bound from Llanelli for Les Sables d'Olonne with coal sank after a collision with SS Ithaca (Greece) which did not stop. The captain was later arrested in Wapping Dock, Bristol.
- 3 May – the schooner Talbot and an unidentified ship collided off Trevose Head; the Talbot's crew were taken off the wreck by the Flying Cloud and landed at Padstow. It has been suggested that the unidentified ship was the SS Ithaca (see above).

=== 1876 ===
- 17 May – a crabber the Johanna (United Kingdom) overturned in an easterly gale with the loss of all three crew consisting of a father and two of his sons.
- Thusnelda wrecked off Trefusis Point in Carrick Roads.
- 26 December – 363-ton barque Andre (Austria-Hungary) carrying coal from Newport to Taranto ran ashore near Lamorna Cove in a southerly gale.
- Emma Jane (United Kingdom wrecked at Newquay

=== 1877 ===
- 3 March – sailing barge Elizabeth Scown (United Kingdom) with a cargo of granite hit the reef near the Bude breakwater. The Bude Lifeboat ( Royal National Lifeboat Institution) was struck by a large wave breaking her rudder and several oars, and capsized when hit by a second wave. The coxswain James Maynard was the only crew member not to wear a regulation cork lifejacket and the only casualty.
- 24 April – galliot Margeritha Hellinga with a cargo of beans ran ashore on Loe Bar.
- 24 November – Porthleven fishing boat Swan (United Kingdom) wrecked on Loe Bar.

=== 1878 ===
==== January ====
- 4 January – the Bilbao steamship Ana ( Spain) hit the Three Stones Oar, under Morvah Cliff, Cornwall while bound for Santander from Liverpool with a general cargo. The crew took to the ship's boat and drifted for seven hours before being picked up between the Longships and The Brisons by the William Banks and landed at Falmouth. Large quantities of drapery, groceries, brass pipe and ironmongery were salvaged.
- 25 January (first report) – a Cardiff steamship foundered and became a total loss off Padstow.
- 25 January (first report) – Pioneer (United Kingdom): Wreckage of the steamship was found off Padstow. She was carrying coal and unspecified cargo from Briton Ferry to Hayle.

==== February ====
- 1 February – 30-ton Boulogne sloop Providence (France) struck a rock and sank near the Runnelstone while carrying coal from Cardiff to Nantes. Her crew took to the ship's boat.

==== March ====
- 7 March – fishing boat Helena of Penzance (United Kingdom) wrecked on rocks at the entrance to Porthleven harbour.
- 18 March – the schooner Auspicious (United Kingdom) carrying coal and unspecified cargo from Saundersfoot to Lowestoft sprang a leek in fine weather and foundered 15 miles (24 km) north of Godrevy Island. The crew landed in St Ives on the same day and the Board of Trade enquiry found she may have been abandoned prematurely.
- 20 March – steamship Strombole steamed into the Maenheere Rock at the Lizard and afterwards ran into the cove where she became a total wreck.
- 24 March – the barque Marco Primogenito (Austria-Hungary) carrying coal and unspecified cargo from Greenock to Alexandria went ashore in Hell Bay, on the Camel estuary. The Stepper Point signal station was inoperative due to the bad weather and, without instructions the barque was on the wrong, St Minver, side of the estuary. The hull went to matchwood within twenty minutes and an inspection of the hull found it was poorly constructed and held together with only spike nails.

==== May ====
- 15 May – Dolphin (United Kingdom) the ship from Hull sprung a leak at latitude 49, longitude 70.10. A bottle containing the ships position was found in Padstow harbour, Cornwall, along with the following message: Water gaining. Crew taking to boats.

==== August ====
- 15 August – tourist steamer Albert (United Kingdom) from Falmouth ran aground at Bishop's Quay on the Helford River. She re-floated on two days later.

==== October ====
- 5 October – schooner Earl of Devon (United Kingdom) was scuttled after breaking free of her moorings and drifting through the harbour at Penzance.
- 6 October – the lugger Alexandre (France) struck the east side of Penberth Cove, and broke up. The ships boat was washed ashore at Perranuthnoe.

==== November ====
- 6 November – schooner Fear Not (United Kingdom) became a total wreck on Hayle Bar during a storm while being towed by the steam-tug North Star.
- 12 November – fishing boat Jabez of St Ives (United Kingdom) drifted onto rocks at Clodgy Point in a gale. Three members of one family, the Bassets, drowned and two other fishermen survived.
- 14 November – Liverpool steam collier Bessie (United Kingdom) hit the western side of the Hayle Estuary and fortunately floated off and was carried by the wind and tide to the eastern side of the river. Bessie later became high and dry on Hayle Bar and her cargo and rigging were removed in an attempt to refloat her.
- 29 November – brig (or barque) San Juan (United Kingdom) was hit by an unnamed steamer near The Lizard. Fifteen of the crew perished with only one saved when he was picked up by the steamer and transferred to a Falmouth fishing boat.

==== December ====
- 15 December – Swansea schooner Leader (United Kingdom) was carrying zinc ore from London to her home port when she was hit by the North Shields steamer Ben Ledi on her starboard bow, about 20 miles (32 km) north of St Ives. Four of the five crew of Leader survived and were landed at Falmouth when Ben Ledi put in for repairs. The Board of Trade enquiry found the chief officer of Ben Ledi at fault with careless navigation and cancelled his certificate.
- 24 December – Portreath owned brigantine Penair (United Kingdom) broke her tow, and was driven onto the east bank of the River Hayle during a gale. She was towed off on 30 December and was found to have little damage to her hull.
- December – steam-ship Cornwall (United Kingdom) ran into rocks at Land's End. The keel was replaced at Falmouth by Messrs Harvey and Co.

==== Unknown date ====
- Antonia Cane (Gibraltar), three pieces of board collected by the Custom House Officer, Mr Huxtable, at Newquay, Cornwall, on 28 October contained the words Antonia Cane and Gibraltar.
- Cambria, the quarter-board of Cambria was washed up on the beach at Sennen Cove.

=== 1879 ===
==== February ====
- 1 February – lugger Angé (France) went ashore in a strong SSE at Porthcurno. The crew of four were saved by employees of the Eastern Telegraph Company.

==== April ====
- 14 April – fishing boat Robert and Agnes (United Kingdom) went ashore on the western side of the Hayle Estuary while attempting to enter the harbour.
- 15 April – tug North Star (United Kingdom) driven ashore on the western side of the Hayle estuary when her screw was fouled by a rope while attempting to refloat the stranded Robert and Agnes.
- 22 April – trawler Maria of Plymouth ran on to the Gear Rock, off Penzance and began to break up.

==== May ====
- 17 May – brig Ponthieu (France) drifted in Mount's Bay, Cornwall, after losing a mast and her sails. She eventually grounded at Perranuthnoe and all the crew were saved by the coastguard and lifeboat Richard Lewis ( Royal National Lifeboat Institution). She was carrying iron-ore from Pomaron to Liverpool.

==== June ====
- 15 June – brig Scot's Craig (United Kingdom) ran aground, in thick fog, under the Lizard Lighthouse, despite the foghorn sounding. Scot's Craig refloated on a rising tide and proceeded to Greenock.

==== July ====
- 1 July – Plymouth schooner Foam (United Kingdom) ran aground on Luburcur Beach, near St Anthony's Lighthouse, with the loss of two crew. Foam was carrying sugar from her home port to Marseille.
- 20 July – Falmouth schooner Naiad (United Kingdom) was wrecked on the Manacles during a south-west gale and poor visibility. The schooner was carrying coal to Falmouth and Truro from Port Talbot and was the second wreck on the reef in three weeks.
- 31 July – The Aberdeen Line passenger ship Pericles (United Kingdom) grounded on Penere Point, on the shore-side of The Manacles, and refloated on a rising tide two hours later. The ship continued on her journey to Sydney with 496 emigrants, and on the following day headed for Plymouth for repairs to a leak in the fore peak.

==== August ====
- 1 August – Chepstow ketch Hannah Louisa (United Kingdom) was beached at Perranporth after the captain mistook Perran for Padstow. The crew was taken off by the rocket apparatus, the cargo retrieved and the ship was refloated on 4 August.
- 4 August – Hannah Louisa (United Kingdom) foundered off Trevose Head while being towed to Padstow by the steam-tug Amazon. Two of the eight on board lost their lives.
- 11 August – SS Nandid (United Kingdom) was in ballast when she ran ashore at Mear's Point, Coverack in thick fog. She was en route for Cardiff from London.

==== September ====
- 6 September – a 949-ton steam ship with sails, the Brest (United Kingdom) of Glasgow, went ashore at Polbarrow near Lizard Point, Cornwall at full speed in thick fog. All the crew and passengers were saved by the RNLI lifeboat, Joseph Armstrong and local fishing boats.

==== December ====
- 15 December – an unnamed Lizard pilchard boat sank off Green Lane. All on board saved.
- unknown date – Elizabeth Hendricka driven ashore at Poljew Cove, between Gunwalloe and Mullyon while en route for Bilbao with empty casks. All four crew survived.
- unknown date – Trieste barque Leopoldine Bauer (Austria-Hungary) went ashore at Coombe Valley, Morwenstow while en route from Dublin to Cardiff in ballast. Her crew took to the boats and were picked up by a passing steamship and landed at Cardiff.
- Unknown date Forest Deer (United Kingdom wrecked at Newquay

=== 1880 ===
==== January ====
- 11 January – ketch Hesperus (United Kingdom) went ashore at Battery Point under St Ives Head (St Ives Island), while en route from Liverpool for Calstock with a cargo of 140 tons of coal. All four crew were saved and the captain bought the wreck for £5.

==== February ====
- 9 February – the Aberystwith schooner Jane and Ellen (United Kingdom) went ashore on the beach at Charlestown. All the crew survived.

Not all crew survived Charlestown burial records show Richard Evans aged 32 of aberystwith and David Arthur Bowen aged 21 of aberystwith were both buried 12th Feb 1880 after drowning from the wreck of the Jane Ellen

- 9 February – schooner Sisters (United Kingdom) of St Ives went ashore approximately 150 yards east of Pentewan breakwater while carrying coal from Cardiff to Charlestown, Cornwall. One of the four crew survived.
- 9 February – brig Sophie (Italy) went ashore near St Mawes on Polwarth Beach.
- 9 February – the Dieppe steamer Valentine (France) foundered off the Lizard with only one crew member surviving out of eighteen.
- 14 February – brigantine Gypsy ( Newfoundland) went aground in hurricane-force winds at Downes Cove, halfway between Kennack Sands and Coverack. All nine crew managed to climb ashore just before the ship went to pieces.

==== March ====
- 26 March – steamer Dowlais (United Kingdom) foundered on the Runnelstone with the loss of two of the crew.

==== April ====
- 21 April – The 72-ton galliot, Emmanuel (German Empire) from Emden was driven ashore on Cudden Point, Mount's Bay during a gale. The four crew jumped ashore and climbed the cliff to safety. The ship refloated and was washed eastwards to the mouth of Little Harry Sowan where it went to pieces.

==== May ====
- 4 May – the schooner Conovium (United Kingdom) of Aberystwyth hit rocks off Lizard Point while carrying 152 tons of cement from London to Dublin. The captain miscalculated the ship's position blaming the intensity of the Lizard lighthouse. The four crew rowed to Penzance in the ship's boat.

==== July ====
- 3 July – the lugger Manne Du Cel (France) with a cargo of coal from Newport to St Malo, sprung a leak in the North Channel and despite efforts to keep the vessel afloat, abandoned her when approximately 10 miles off the Lizard. The four crew were landed at Falmouth the following Monday.
- 10 July – the steamer Alert (United Kingdom) struck one of The Manacles, penetrating the hull. The ship was able to reach the nearest beach before floundering. Following temporary repairs she was towed to Falmouth that evening,

==== August ====
- 7 August – the smack Harriet of Bideford was wrecked on Pentire Point East, Newquay while carrying coal from Swansea to Hayle. There was controversy over the launching of the lifeboat and the crew were eventually saved by the Newquay lifeboat.
- 27 August – the St Ives fishing vessel, Nannie Noall was hit by the steamer Aurora (United Kingdom) about four or five miles south-west of the Wolf Rock. Two of the seven crew drowned.

==== September ====
- 13 September – the 40-ton schooner-yacht Media (United Kingdom) dragged her anchor and was driven ashore on Trefusis Point during a gale from the SSW. There was no loss of life.
- 15 September – the Fowey steamship Ellen Frances (United Kingdom) en route from Swansea to Mevagissey with coal was driven ashore on Carrack Gladden Beach, St Ives. The crew took to the ship's boat and landed safely.
- 15 September – the Plymouth ship Jane Smith (United Kingdom) en route from Llanelly to Ipswich with stone coal, grounded off St Ives. The six crew were rescued by the St Ives lifeboat.
- 16 September – the coal-carrying schooner Bonne Adèle (France) was sheltering from a gale in St Ives Bay when she was driven by the wind onto Hayle Bar, and driven ashore on Lelant beach. The Hayle Lifeboat took the crew off.

==== October ====
- 7 October – the lugger Jane (United Kingdom) was swamped by heavy seas half a mile south-east of her home port of Penzance, during a SSE hurricane force gale on return from the North Sea fisheries. All seven crew lost.
- 21 October – the Bideford ketch Bessie Wilkingson (United Kingdom) with coal from Newport ran aground on the Blackrock, outside of their destination, Mevagissey.
- 22 October – the Whitby brig Marys dragged her anchor and hit the Black Rock at the entrance to Falmouth harbour, drifted leeward and sank between the rock and shore. Three of the crew died.
- 24 October – the ketch Blanche sprang a leak 40 miles (64 km) west south-west of The Lizard and foundered. The master was landed at Fowey, Cornwall, by the Lizzie Trembath. Blanche was carrying 12 tons of stone ballast and about 25 tons of nuts. A large quantity of nuts washed up at Porthleven in early November.
- unknown – the Hartlepool vessel Fortitude (United Kingdom), while carrying coal and iron from Deal for Sidmouth was driven ashore and wrecked at Towan Beach, near St Anthony Head.

==== December ====
- 4 or 5 December – The Liverpool ship Corbey put into Falmouth, Cornwall following a ten-minute collision with the Star of Bengal, 23 miles (37 km) off The Lizard. The Star of Bengal (United Kingdom) is believed to have sunk with all hands. The 1800-ton ship was carrying salt from London to Calcutta.
- 30 December (first report) – The wreckage on an unknown ship was washed ashore in St Just parish.

== 1891–1900 ==
=== 1891 ===
==== January ====
- 11 January – steamer Almsford (United Kingdom) was hit on the port side by the steamer Ethel (United Kingdom). Almsford foundered stern-first off St Just and the crew were picked by the steamer North Devon and landed at St Ives; one life was lost. Ethel made for St Ives, where she was beached.
- 16 January – brigantine Bonne Julienne (France) foundered eight miles south-west of Mousehole while en route from Swansea to Brest. The crew survived and landed at Mousehole.
- 29 January – brigatine Josephet Marie (France) collided with the Barry streamer Blairmount (United Kingdom) in fog off Trevose Head while carrying pitchwood from Hennebont, France to Newport, Wales.

==== February ====
- 5 February – the 1,261-ton steamship Chiswick ran aground in calm weather on the north-east ledges of the Seven Stones Reef, while bound for St Nazaire, France, with coal from Cardiff, Wales. The captain is supposed to have said "every man for himself" before going down along with ten crew and his ship. Eight survivors were picked up by the Sevenstones Lightship's longboat.
- 9 February – steamship Camel (United Kingdom) wrecked on Lee Ore Rock, near Land's End while bound for Plymouth from Garston, Liverpool.

==== March ====
Great Blizzard of 1891

- 9 March – schooner Agnes and Helen (United Kingdom) of Beaumaris went ashore at Bream Bay, near Falmouth. She was carrying cement from Faversham to Newport and was a total loss.
- 9 March – Agnes Louisa foundered and was a total loss at Newquay.
- 9 March – schooner Alice Brookall carrying coal from Swansea to Jersey ran aground at Mutton Cove, Godrevy. The crew of five managed to climb ashore and huddle together until daybreak when they climbed the cliff to safety. Also known as Alize Crookall.
- 9 March – the ketches Aquilon of Jersey and Edwin reported lost with all hands near Porthoustock.
- 9 March – ketch Catherine (United Kingdom) carrying nitrate of soda from Plymouth to Truro was a total loss at Porthoustock.
- 9 March – the smack The Dove (United Kingdom) bound for Gweek from Exeter with manure was driven ashore at Porthoustock. All three crew were saved by James Henry Cliff carrying a line through the surf.
- 9 March – steamship Dundela carrying fruit from St Michael for Hull ran aground at Portloe.
- 9 March – schooner Perseverance (United Kingdom) of Preston ran aground one mile east of Hayle Bar while carrying coal from Swansea to Salcombe. The crew of four landed at daybreak.
- 9 March – the Penzance schooner Prima Donna foundered off the Land's End during a blizzard. She was carrying 308 tons of coal and there were five men onboard.
- 9 or 10 March – at Falmouth a big sail boat and a coal hulk was driven ashore, the latter knocking down a wall and the Carbon which sank at her moorings. Approximately one dozen trawlers, sailing boats or punts were badly damaged or sunk.
- 9 or 10 March – iron schooner Naiad (United Kingdom) of Calstock was blown on her side at Danescombe Bottoms on the River Tamar.

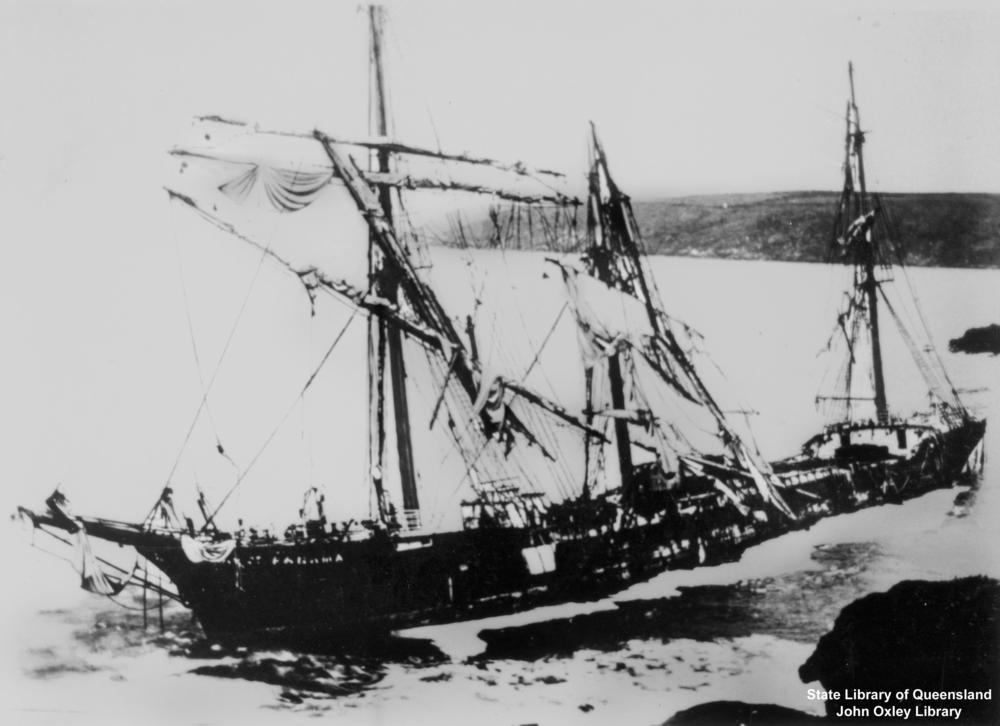
Bay of Panama shipwreck

- 9 or 10 March – the Rose of Portscathoe is thought to have foundered off the Land's End, during the blizzard, with the loss of all hands.
- 10 March – the four-masted steel Bay of Panama (United Kingdom) was wrecked under Nare Head near Porthoustock Cove with some of the crew freezing to death in the rigging. Nineteen were saved by the rocket apparatus two days later but eighteen others died. She was carrying 17,000 bales of jute from Calcutta to Dundee.
- 10 March – steamer Carl Hirschberg (Germany) in ballast from Hamburg to Cardiff went ashore at Portscatho.
- 10 March – brig Crusader (United Kingdom) of Aberystwyth taking slate from Caernarvon to Hamburg was abandoned off Trevose Head with seven feet of water in her hold. The crew drifted and were picked up 30 mile offshore, 19 hours later and taken to Falmouth by the fishing smack Gertrude. Six of the seven crew survived.
- 10 March – schooner Fairy Belle (United Kingdom) of Padstow was lost at Newquay.

==== September ====
- 8 September – the 39 ton Penzance ketch, Garland was taking in water while anchored off Lundy. She made for Padstow, beached and became a total wreck, losing 55 tons of salt.
- 30 September – the Longships lighthouse reported a schooner Annie Davis (United Kingdom) of Carmarthen to be in difficulties and despite a search by the Sennen Cove lifeboat Denzil and Maria Onslow ( Royal National Lifeboat Institution) after flares were seen off the Brisons she was not found. The ship was found the following day abandoned in the Bristol Channel.

==== October ====
- 9 October – a brig Buron (France) was wrecked on the Lowlands, near Coverack. She was carrying timber from the Baltic to Milford Haven.
- 26 October – 60-ton ketch Viceroy (United Kingdom) of Cardiff sank off Godrevy. The three man crew escaped in the ship's boat which capsized at the entrance to St Ives harbour and they drowned.

==== December ====
- 3 December – the Louise (Norway) with a cargo of timber sank on the approach to Porthleven harbour.
- 8 December – the Brixham schooner Torbay Lass (United Kingdom) sank within a few hundred metres of Penzance harbour. On tow after unloading her cargo of coal on St Michael's Mount the tug Merlin suffered a drop in steam pressure and Torbay Lass drifted onto the Cressars off Penzance promenade. She was pulled clear by the steamship Lady of the Isles but sank after a few hundred yards.

==== Unknown date ====
- unknown date – cargo vessel Londos (United Kingdom) out of Cardiff caught fire about ten miles off Hartland Point. The fire spread quickly and the crew abandoned ship landing at Compass Point, Bude. The Londos, with a cargo of petroleum and benzoline, drifted all day and finally went ashore 1.5 miles north of Boscastle at Beeny beach. A large crowd watched as casks, filled with petroleum, hit the water and burst into flames; the sea appeared to be on fire.

=== 1892 ===
- 21 February – Fratelli (Austria-Hungary) may have hit the Runnelstone and sank in deep water. Five of her crew were sighted from Lamorna in a punt which capsized off Carn Dhu throwing her occupants into the water where they all drowned. One body was washed up at Chyandour, Penzance, while the punt, plus another, was later brought into Newlyn.
- – the County of Salop (United Kingdom) beached at Wanson Mouth, south of Widemouth Bay. The 28 crew and two passengers were saved by the rocket apparatus.
- – a barge Government Lighter No 7 broke her tow from the tug SS Traveller, near the Longships, drifted up the Bristol Channel and was wrecked on the cliffs at Morwenstow.

=== 1893 ===
- 27 April – Porthleven fishing boat The Emblem (PZ 575) (United Kingdom) wrecked on Trigg rocks.
- 20 December – the Iota (Italy) sank off the coast at Lye Rock, Tintagel. The crew were able to get onto the rock and apart from a youth of 14 were saved: his grave is marked by a wooden cross (the name is given in the official Italian usage, surname first: Catanese Domenico, on a lifebuoy) in Tintagel churchyard. The four rescuers were awarded the Italian Silver Medal for Bravery.
- 18 November – steamer Cintra (United Kingdom) wrecked on Carbis Bay beach, St Ives, Cornwall, five crew rescued. She was carrying coal to Dartmouth from Newport.
- 18 November – SS Rosedale (United Kingdom) wrecked on Porthminster Beach, St Ives, Cornwall. Sixteen crew saved. She was heading from Southampton to Penarth in ballast.
- 18 November – steamer Bessie wrecked on Carbis Bay beach.
- 18 November – Vulture (United Kingdom) dragged her anchors and drifted ashore at Carbis Bay while bound for Dartmouth from Cardiff with coal. (See 1874 as well)
- 18 November – Hampshire (United Kingdom) of Glasgow sank ten miles north of Godrevy with the loss of fifteen men.

=== 1894 ===
- 29 January – brigantine Welm (Sweden), (English: William) carrying coal from Swansea wrecked on the Black Rock just to the north of Crackington Haven. Only one of the eight crew survived.
- 11 October – E S Lancaster (United Kingdom) was wrecked on Dinas Point at Trevose Head while in ballast en route from Newhaven to Cardiff.
- 24 November – the Forester hit the Manacles.
- 30 November – the Dryad (United Kingdom) hit the Manacles.
- 24 December – in dense fog HMS Lynx (Royal Navy) struck rocks off Sennen Cove. She managed to make her way to Devonport for repairs.
- brigantine Tullochgorum (United Kingdom) embayed near Millook and wrecked on Upton Cliff to the south of Bude.
- schooner Robert (Norway) drifted ashore in a NNW gale at Stanbury Mouth, Morwenstow. The crew managed to reach shore in the ship's boat.

=== 1895 ===
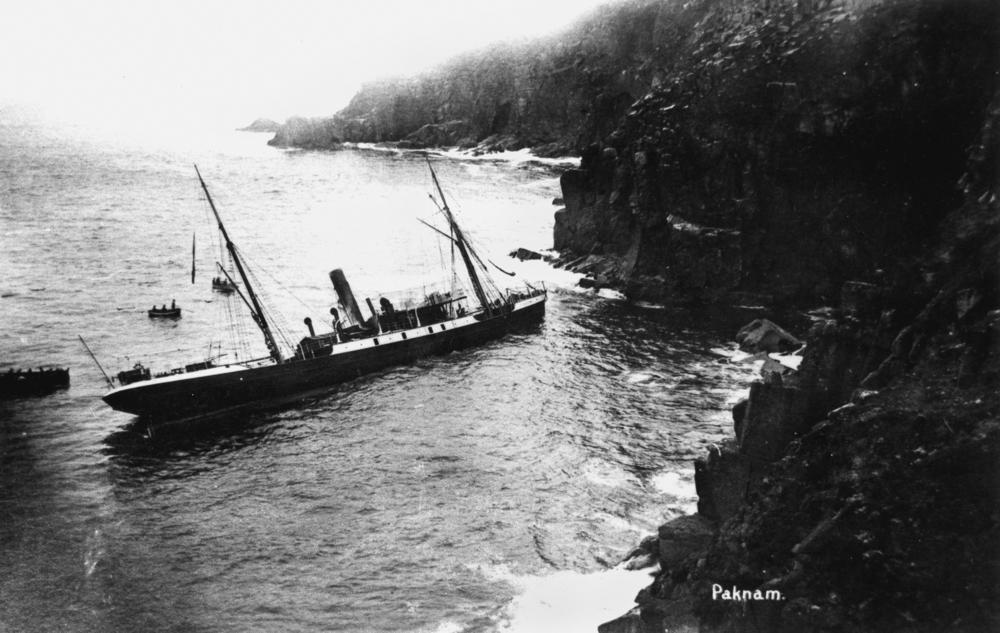
Paknam shipwreck

- 1 January – barque Antoinette on voyage from Newport to Santos, Brazil with coal lost parts of her masts near Lundy, then broke her tow and drifted onto the Doom Bar the following day. All crew saved.
- 25 January – Hayle lifeboat New Oriental Bank ( Royal National Lifeboat Institution) was dragged overland more than eleven miles to Portreath to come to the aid of the SS Escurial. Eleven crew of the Escurial drowned.
- 29 January – the Andola struck the Carclew Rocks, the Porthoustock Lifeboat saved twenty-eight crew.
- 28 March Saintonge (France) – ran aground, approximately 200 yards from the shore in calm weather on rocks in Boskenna Bay, five miles west of Penzance. She was finally abandoned on 1 April with all the crew and some of the cargo saved.
- 13 May – passenger steamship Paknam (France) was wrecked at Morvah Cliffs.
- 17 October – Harberton (United Kingdom) of London and en route to Barry in ballast when she hit the Kettle's Bottom Reef between Land's End and the Longships. On a rising tide she drifted off and a steam tug towed her into Whitesand Bay.
- 4 November – the 1700-ton three–masted ship Granite State (United States) of Portsmouth, New Hampshire hit the Runnelstone while bound from La Plata to Swansea with wheat. While at Falmouth, awaiting orders, her master declined the offer of a tow from the tug Elliot and Jeffery for £35. The tug, believing she would be needed, followed Granite State, which after hitting the Runnelstone was seriously damaged. She took her in tow to Porthcurno where she was beached in the hope of repairing her but she broke up a few days later.
- 26 November – barque Anne Elizabeth hit the Manacles. Five drowned and four saved by the rocket apparatus.
- 24 December – schooner Pilgrim (United Kingdom) went missing off Land's End

=== 1896 ===
- March – brigantine Henry Harvey United Kingdom stranded on Battery Rocks, Penzance during a gale. Five people aboard were rescued by lifeboat.
- March – sailing ship Bay of Panama was wrecked under Nare Head, near St Keverne, during a great blizzard. The ship carried jute from Calcutta; 18 of those on board died but 19 were saved.
- 26 September – Alexander Yeats (United Kingdom) ran aground at Gurnard's Head. Crew of 19 rescued. Alternative date of 20 September.
- 8 November – Giles Lang of St Ives deliberately beached at Bude Haven in order to save the lives of the crew.

=== 1897 ===
- 20 March – the crew of the Plantagenet (United Kingdom) landed at Coverack after she ran ashore on rocks close to Beagle Point. She was bound from St Valery for Runcorn.
- 29 September – HMS Thrasher (Royal Navy) and HMS Lynx (Royal Navy) on Dodman Point in fog. Both successfully refloated; HMS Lynx managed to refloat herself and limped to Devonport while HMS Thrasher was escorted to Falmouth and eventually made it to Devonport for repairs.
- Channel Island schooner Jersey Packet grounded near the lock at Bude.
- Welsh schooner Margaret and Mary (United Kingdom) of Port Dinorwic was lost on Gurnard's Head.

=== 1898 ===
- 8 May – barque Abernyte (United Kingdom) carrying nitrate of soda from Caleta Buena to Falmouth wrecked under Rill Head on the Lizard.
- 14 October – Mohegan (United Kingdom) ran aground on The Manacles, off The Lizard with 106 lives lost and 44 saved.
- 9 November – schooner rigged steamship Bluejacket (United Kingdom) in ballast and en route to her home port of Cardiff from Plymouth hit the Longships in clear weather and became a total wreck. Lifeboat Ann Newbon ( Royal National Lifeboat Institution) towed the crew to Sennen Cove.

=== 1899 ===
- 5 January – the steamer Voorwaarts (Italy) at Morwenstow while bound from Cardiff for Genoa with coal.
- 4 February – the Penzance schooner Mary Hannah (United Kingdom) on passage from Cardiff to Plymouth with a cargo of coal. Disabled after the main boom was damaged in a huge sea and gale off the Lizard, she headed for Newlyn but was unable to enter the harbour and ran ashore at Tolcarne. All four crew were rescued by breeches–buoy.
- 2 May – the liner City of Paris (United States) was grounded at Lowland Point near Coverack, close to where the SS Mohegan ran aground. The Falmouth and Porthoustock lifeboats helped transfer her passengers to tugs; the ship was successfully salved after seven weeks work.
- October – the Welsh collier Llandaff (United Kingdom) sailed into the breakwater at Bude during a gale. Her crew was saved by the Bude rocket apparatus (also wrecked on the Cornish coast in 1889). Scheduled Ancient Monument no 906161.
- Coastal cargo ship SS Lynx United Kingdom) wrecked near Port Isaac

=== 1900 ===
- March 1900 – Concord (United Kingdom) sank on the Triggs, just outside her home port of Porthleven.
- 11 April – the ketch Peace and Plenty of Lowestoft (United Kingdom), struck the Greenaway Rocks, off Padstow. Five of her crew were rescued by the Trebetherick Rocket Brigade and three were drowned. The lifeboat Arab ( Royal National Lifeboat Institution) was struck by a tremendous wave which buried the lifeboat, washed eight of her crew overboard and broke all ten of her oars. The lifeboat was wrecked on the rocks and all the crew got ashore safely. The steam lifeboat James Stevens No. 4 ( Royal National Lifeboat Institution) then launched and, as she was leaving the harbour, she was caught by a heavy swell and capsized.
- 26 May – 1782-ton Wandsbeck (Germany) of Hamburg carrying wheat became a total wreck off Polpeor Cove in calm weather. The crew took to the ship's boats and the wreck was bought by a Falmouth man for £55.
- 7 November – ketch Star of Scilly (United Kingdom) wrecked on Porthminster Point, St Ives with the crew rescued by the lifeboat.
- 7 November – barque Concezione (Italy) driven ashore in Widemouth Bay in a NW gale with the loss of one life. She was en route from Nantes to Swansea with pitwood.
- 7 November – Irish cargo ship City of Vienna sank after a collision with an unidentified steamship off the north Cornwall coast. Eighteen of the twenty crew were lost (only one survivor according to another source).
- 11 November − 424-ton barque Glimt (Norway) of Stavanger wrecked off Polpeor with all the crew saved by the Lizard and Cadgwith lifeboats ( Royal National Lifeboat Institution). The cabin boy refused to go back to sea, lived in Cadgwith for a few years and was known as Robert Glimt. The wreck lead to poor attendance "all week" at Landewednack School with the bigger boys "wrecking".
- 28 December – barque Capricorno (Austria-Hungary) wrecked on Bude breakwater while bound from Cardiff to Sao Paul de Loando. She was towed out of Cardiff by the tug Fastnet and when the hawser parted, her Captain declined the offer of continuing the tow. Attempts were made to land the crew by the rocket apparatus, but due to some of the crew taking refuge in the cabin the lines could not be permanently secured. Twelve of the fourteen crew were lost. Another ship the Tordenskjold heading for the same port with a similar cargo was also lost in the Bristol Channel.
- December – the crew of the Seine 27 saved by the Coastguard rescue team at Mawgan Porth

== See also ==
- Archaeology of shipwrecks
- Protection of Wrecks Act 1973
- List of designations under the Protection of Wrecks Act
