= Jessie Logan =

The Jessie Logan was an American-built English East Indiaman which was wrecked after striking rocks near Boscastle on the north coast of Cornwall in South West England in January 1843. The subsequent unlawful raiding of the ship's cargo by locals led to a change in the law.

== The ship ==
Jessie Logan was a cargo ship built in North America in 1830. It was known as a “Quebecker” and was owned by J Logan & Co of Liverpool. The ship weighed 805 tons.

== The wreck ==
Jessie Logan left Calcutta on 14 September 1842 bound for Liverpool with a cargo of rice, cotton, flax, spices, buffalo horns and hides, shellac, raw sugar and dyewood. On 22 January 1843, the ship was driven onto rocks near Blackapit, just south of Willapark, Boscastle. The storm which affected northern France and South West England caused the loss of 180 ships and the deaths of 450 people.

Heavy seas on 13 January had carried away the ship's poop, crushed its stern, and swept the decks. The ship was aiming for the safety of Bude or Tintagel Haven when the ferocity of the storm raised to gale force. Distress signals were fired but with the vessel completely unmanageable, the crew abandoned ship on 15 January and were picked up by another ship, the Lynx. At the time, there was 13 feet (4.0 m) of water in the hold. Now at the full mercy of wind and waves, the ship drove onto rocks near Blackapit, just south of the Willapark headland on 22 January.

== Wreckers ==
The dyes stained the seas red around the wreck site and parts of the ship and cargo were driven onto the shore. Wrecks were seen as an act of providence in nineteenth century Cornwall and despite the presence of coastguards and the ship's owner, little could be done to prevent locals hauling away the washed up cargo. This opportunistic salvage is known as wrecking even though many wreckers had no involvement in a ship's loss. Two ringleaders, Hugh Luckey and Robert Chapman were both caught and sentenced to a year's hard labour.

== Aftermath ==
Barrister William Palmer proposed to make the hundreds of Boscastle people who plundered the Jessie Logan liable under law. Palmer's greater concern was with those wreckers who lured ships to their doom. However, there is no evidence that anyone looting the Jessie Logan's cargo fought coastguards or endangered life; there was simply too much cargo for the limited number of coastguards to protect. Palmer's suggestions were realised in 1846 when the first major bill for the consolidation of the laws of wreck and salvage was passed.

In August 1975, divers Paul Day and Frank Bridge salvaged the anchor of the Jessie Logan. The anchor had been discovered by local diver Michael Webber. It is now on display in Boscastle and is commemorated with a plaque.

== Popular culture ==
Folk singers Paul and Penny Mack released Wreck of the Jessie Logan in 1995.

== See also ==
- List of shipwrecks of Cornwall (19th century)
