= Willapark =

Willapark may refer to:

- Willapark (Boscastle)
- Willapark (Tintagel)
