= Willapark (Boscastle) =

Iron Age hill fort

Coordinates: 50.689°N 4.703°W

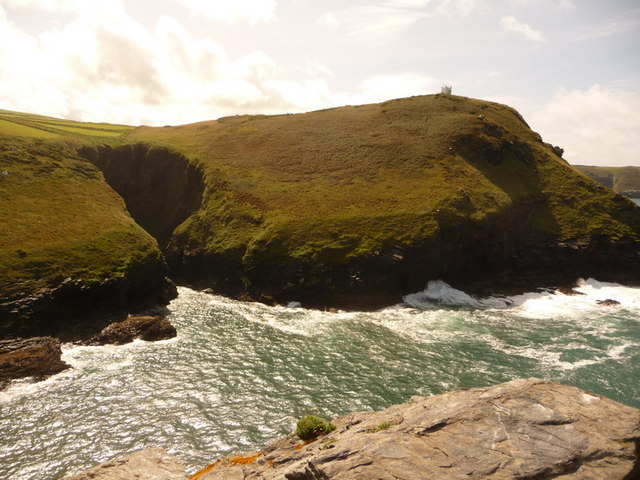
Willapark

Willapark (grid reference SX090913) is a 317-foot high promontory just south of Boscastle on the north coast of Cornwall in South West England. It is the site of an Iron Age hill fort and a small nineteenth century folly, now a coastguard lookout.

== The Promontory Fort ==
The headland is joined to the mainland by a narrow isthmus. Iron Age tribesmen built a wall or bank fronted by a ditch across the land bridge, giving themselves a secure clifftop castle. The earthworks were probably dug sometime around 200 BC. The headland appears too rocky to support permanent occupation and may have been used to protect harvested crops from raiders and as a stronghold in which to retreat during enemy attacks. Small earthworks known as “pillow mounds” are the remains of manmade rabbit warrens daring from the Tudor era.

It has a single 110 metres (360 ft) straight bank, indistinct to the south-west and up to 1.8 metres (5 ft 11 in) high, with a ditch on the landward side at its north-eastern end. The present path onto the headland may indicate the original entrance. The fort overlooks Forrabury Common, a medieval field system.

== The Lookout ==
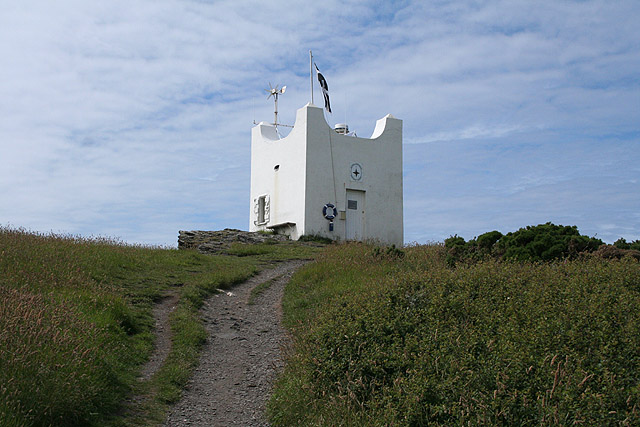
The Lookout

The small, whitewashed, turreted building that currently stands on the Willapark headland is known locally as the Lookout Station. The building was originally a “pleasure house” erected by Boscastle merchant and magistrate Thomas Rickard Avery (1785-1858). Avery appears to have been a colourful character and local stories tell of drinking, gambling, contraband and prostitutes in his clifftop folly. After Avery's death, the Lookout was leased to the Board of Trade who used its strategic position to keep watch on the coast in a bid to prevent smuggling. It was used by the coastguard for almost 100 years until the 1970s, and during this time the original windows were replaced with larger ones to afford better vision. The original granite doorstep is still in place and is made from a crushing stone called an “edge-runner” which will have once been used to crush animal feed. By the 1970s, the building had fallen into disrepair but was rescued by the National Trust who maintained it as a folly and painted it white. In 2002 it was taken over once again by the National Coastwatch Institution. A team of local volunteers and the NCI worked to restore the building which now functions as a lookout station.

== Wreck of the Jessie Logan ==
In hurricane-force winds on 31 March 1843, the East Indiaman Jessie Logan was sunk en route from Calcutta to Liverpool with the loss of all its crew. The ship was hoping to reach the shelter of Tintagel Haven or Bude when it disappeared. Much of the ship's cargo of cotton, sugar, rice and rum was washed ashore where locals carried it away despite attempts by the coastguard to protect it. Ringleaders Hugh Luckey and Robert Chapman were both caught and sentenced to a year's hard labour.
