= Merlin's Cave =

Sea cave in Cornwall, England

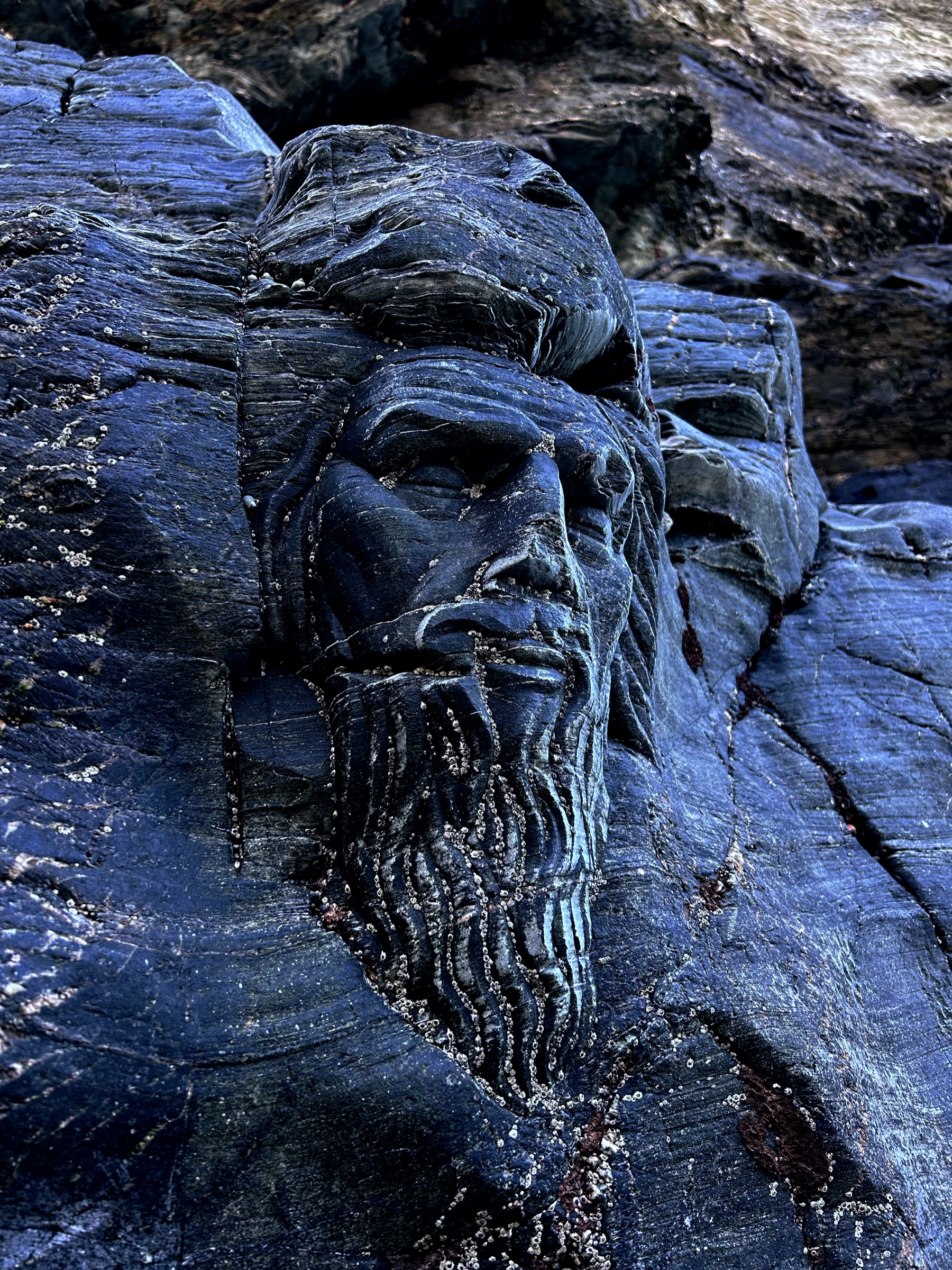
- The 'Sleeping Merlin' sculpture carved into the cliff face near the cave entrance
- Interactive map of Merlin's Cave
- Location: Tintagel, Cornwall, England
- Coordinates: 50.6683°N 4.7594°W
- Length: 100 m
- Discovery: Natural formation
- Geology: Slate and volcanic rock
- Access: Walkable at low tide

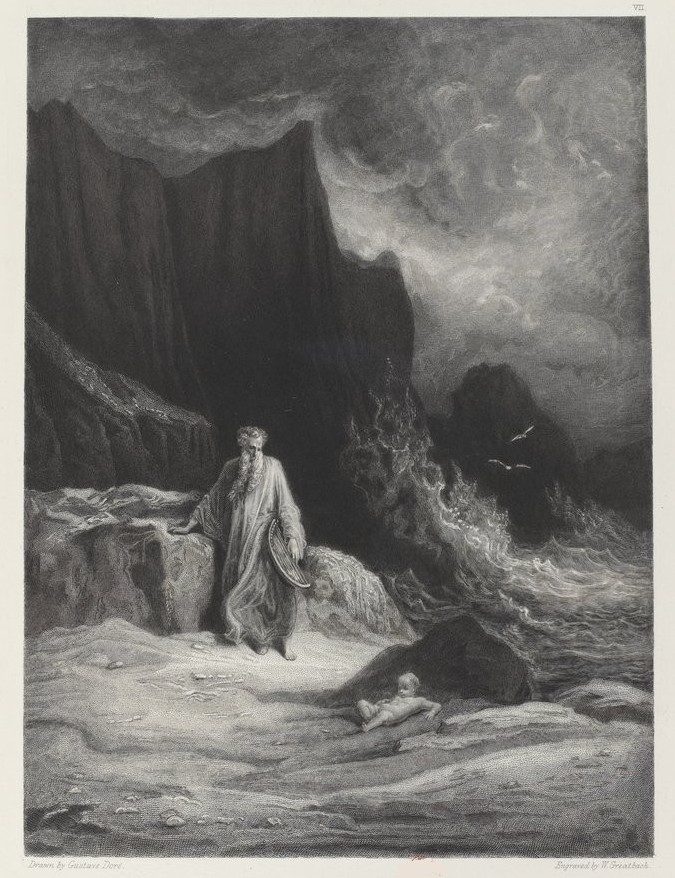
Gustave Doré's illustration of Merlin receiving the infant Arthur on the shores of Tintagel, inspired by Tennyson’s Idylls of the King (c. 1867).

Merlin's Cave is a natural sea tunnel beneath Tintagel Castle in Cornwall, England, connecting Tintagel Haven on the east side of the island to West Cove on the west. At low tide, it is possible to walk from one entrance to the other along a sandy floor. At high tide, the tunnel becomes impassable as it fills with seawater from end to end.

The cave is approximately 100 metres (330 ft) long and was formed by marine erosion along a thrust plane between slate and volcanic rock.

The cave is named after the legendary wizard Merlin, a central figure in Arthurian mythology. This association arises from its proximity to Tintagel Castle, which Geoffrey of Monmouth identified in the 12th century as the site of King Arthur's conception at the behest of Merlin.

== Association with Merlin ==
Tintagel Island has been associated with Merlin and King Arthur since the 12th century, when Geoffrey of Monmouth's Historia Regum Britanniae (c. 1136) claimed it was where Merlin used sorcery to disguise Uther Pendragon and gain access to Igraine's bedchamber, resulting in Arthur's conception without informed consent.

No medieval texts, however, including those by Geoffrey of Monmouth, Robert de Boron, or Chrétien de Troyes, make any reference to Merlin residing in or being associated with a cave at Tintagel. The name Merlin's Cave did not appear in written records until the late 19th century.

The association of the cave with Merlin appears to have originated during the Victorian revival of Arthurian literature. Alfred, Lord Tennyson's epic cycle Idylls of the King (1859–1885) reimagined Arthur's origin story, describing the infant Arthur being washed ashore by the sea and found by Merlin:

And down the wave and in the flame was borne
A naked babe, and rode to Merlin's feet,
Who stoopt and caught the babe,
and cried 'The King! Here is an heir for Uther!'

Though Tennyson did not name a specific location, later interpreters connected this imagery to the sea cave beneath Tintagel Castle. By the late 19th century, the site had become popularly known as Merlin's Cave, with the name appearing in tourist literature and local guidebooks.

This post-Tennyson identification became firmly embedded in the site's cultural identity, and by the 20th century, "Merlin’s Cave" was widely accepted in maps, local signage, and promotional materials. English Heritage, which manages Tintagel Castle, acknowledges that the name derives from Tennyson's influence and confirms that the cave has only been known by that name since the late 19th century.

In 2015, as part of a wider effort to enhance the site's Arthurian narrative and appeal to visitors, English Heritage commissioned a stone relief sculpture depicting Merlin near the entrance of the cave. The carving, portraying a sleeping Merlin emerging from the rock, was created by local stonemason Peter Graham over the course of three months and completed in early 2016. Carved directly into the cliff face and exposed to the elements, the work required Graham to contend with tides, storms, and challenging access. He later described the process as physically demanding, stating that the figure "emerged organically out of that rock."

The installation received mixed reactions. While some praised it as a creative addition to the site's storytelling, others criticised it as a distortion of history. Over 200 members of the Cornwall Association of Local Historians signed an open letter condemning English Heritage's changes at Tintagel, accusing the charity of turning the site into a "fairytale theme park". Local councillor Bert Biscoe voiced similar concerns, describing Merlin as a "comic book character" and warning that the mythologising efforts risked eclipsing the site's authentic medieval and archaeological significance.

In response to the criticism, English Heritage emphasised that Arthurian legend has shaped perceptions of Tintagel for centuries and form an important part of its interpretive narrative. Jeremy Ashbee, Head Curator at English Heritage, commented: "You cannot understand Tintagel's history without understanding how the legends shaped it. Our new interpretation explains this and places these legends within the context of Tintagel's overall history and significance."

== History ==
=== Prehistoric and early use ===
No definitive evidence of Palaeolithic or Neolithic habitation has been recorded in the tidal cave beneath Tintagel Castle. The cave's floor is washed by the sea at high tide, which likely prevented long-term prehistoric occupation. If prehistoric people utilised the cave at all, it may have been only for short-term shelter or coastal foraging; however, no archaeological finds from these periods have been documented in Merlin's Cave to date. The lack of deposits is likely due to the cave's tidal nature and continuous marine erosion.

=== Post-Roman (Early Middle Ages) activity ===
During the 5th to 7th centuries AD, Tintagel was a high-status site engaged in trade across the Celtic and Mediterranean worlds. Archaeologists have noted that the cove at Tintagel's base, protected by a rock wall called the Iron Gate, may have served as a landing spot for boats during this period. Charles Thomas observed that imported pottery and goods from this era were found near the Iron Gate, suggesting that ships unloaded cargo in the sheltered cove by the cave rather than on the more dangerous main beach. The tidal cave and its adjacent inlet likely functioned as a harbour or unloading point for Tintagel's post-Roman settlement.
