= Great Blizzard of 1891 =

Weather event in England

The Great Blizzard of 1891 affected Southern England between 9 and 13 March of that year. Strong winds, cold temperatures and snow which drifted up to 15 ft (4.6 m) high contributed to the deaths of 200 people and 6000 animals. A merchant vessel, the Bay of Panama was one of the casualties, driven onto rocks on the south coast of Cornwall by the storm. Twenty-three people died in this incident alone.
