= List of shipwrecks in 1889 =

The list of shipwrecks in 1889 includes ships sunk, foundered, grounded, or otherwise lost during 1889.

table of contents
1889
| Jan | Feb | Mar | Apr |
| May | Jun | Jul | Aug |
| Sep | Oct | Nov | Dec |
Unknown date

== Unknown date ==
List of shipwrecks: Unknown date in 1889
| Ship | State | Description |
|---|---|---|
| Altmore | Flag unknown | The ship was wrecked on the Nirvaun Reef, in the Fiji Islands in April or May with the loss of at least one life. Eight people were rescued. A boat was reported missing. She was on a voyage from Sydney, New South Wales to San Francisco, California, United States. |
| Ella | France | Lost with all hands in the Atlantic, while heading to the Newfoundland fishing grounds. |
| Hannah | United Kingdom | The ship foundered at sea between 26 August and 19 November. At least five of her crew were rescued. She was on a voyage from Pernambuco to Aracaty, Brazil. |
| Herald of the Morning | Canada | The hulk of the square-rigged sailing ship, severely damaged by fire in Hobsons Bay, New South Wales, Australia, on 15 November 1859 and never repaired, was scuttled c. 1889. |
| Mary E. Bacon | United States | The schooner was abandoned in the Atlantic Ocean. Her crew were rescued by the steamship John Dixon (United Kingdom. Mary E. Bacon was on a voyage from Wilmington, North Carolina to Philadelphia, Pennsylvania. |
| Patriot Queen | United Kingdom | The ship was abandoned and the crew were landed at Philadelphia. |
| Quatre Freres | France | Lost with all hands in the Atlantic, while heading to the Newfoundland fishing grounds. |
