= Tintagel Haven =

Section of coastline in Northern Cornwall, UK

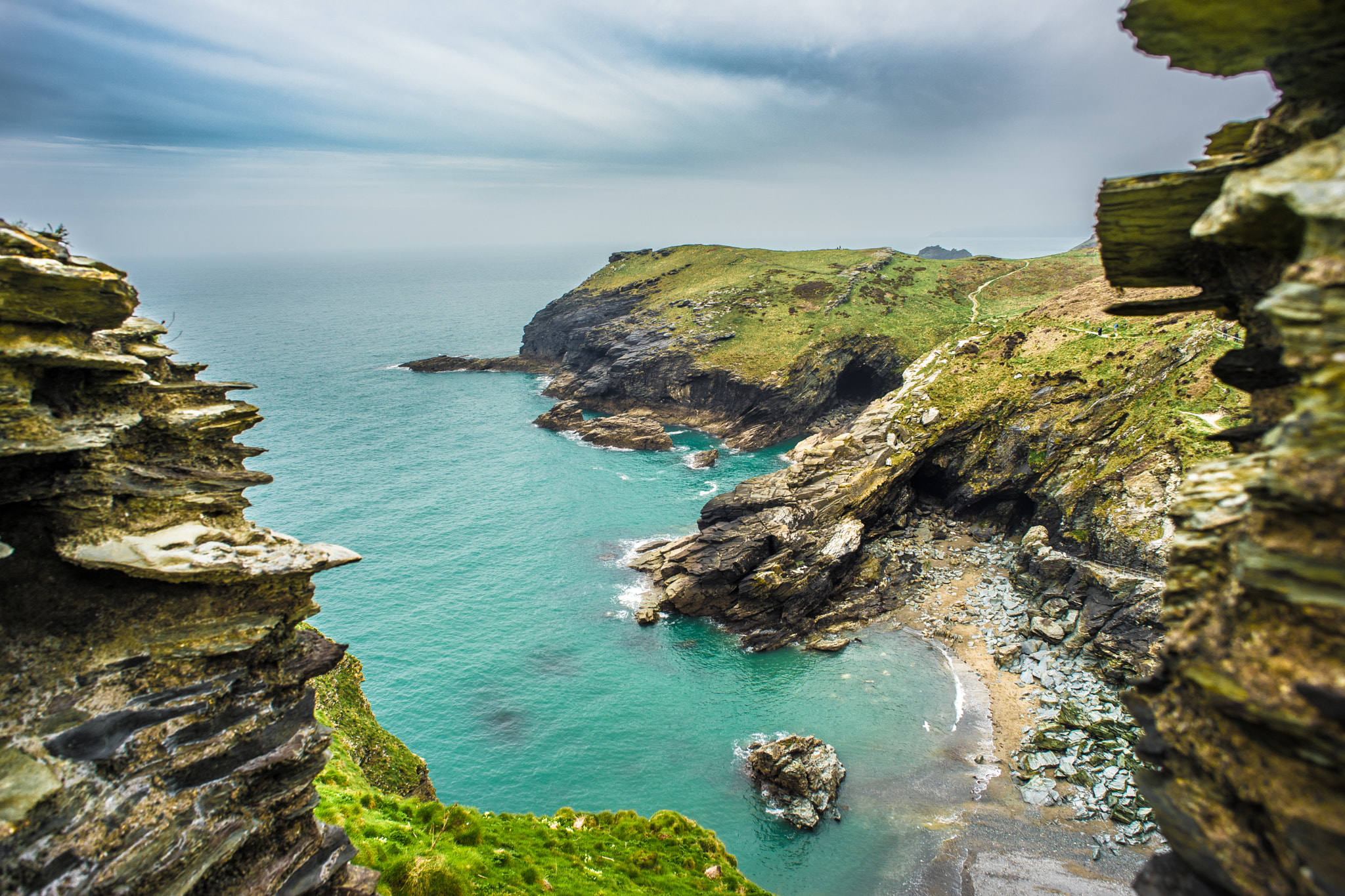

- Coordinates: 50.668°N 4.758°W

Tintagel Haven also known as Castle Cove is a small beach on the north side of Tintagel Island on the north coast of Cornwall, South West England.

Slate from Tintagel's coastal quarries was brought by donkey to the cliffs above Tintagel Haven. Here it was loaded onto beached ships which also brought in cargoes such as Welsh coal. An 1818 sketch of Tintagel castle by J. M. W. Turner shows clifftop derricks where slate from Tintagel’s quarries has been brought on wheeled carts to be loaded onto ships below. The remains of a derrick can still be seen above the beach. In order to manoeuvre ships around the dangerous rocks to access the beach, they were towed by rowing boats then manoeuvred by gangs of men pulling on ropes, a practice known as “hobbling.”

A 100 m (330 ft) long cave that runs through to the south of Tintagel Island is known as Merlin's Cave. From 1870, a lead mine was worked for a short time seaward of Merlin's Cave.
