= Tintagel (electoral division) =

Electoral division of Cornwall in the UK

- Former ward Cornwall Council
- Boundary of Tintagel in Cornwall from 2013-2021.
- County: Cornwall

2013–2021
- Number of councillors: One
- Replaced by: St Teath and Tintagel; Camelford and Boscastle
- Created from: Tintagel

2009–2013
- Number of councillors: One
- Replaced by: Tintagel
- Created from: Council created

Tintagel (Cornish: Tre war Venydh) was an electoral division of Cornwall which returned one member to sit on Cornwall Council between 2009 and 2021. It was abolished at the 2021 local elections, being succeeded by St Teath and Tintagel and Camelford and Boscastle.

== Councillors ==
Election	Member	Party
2009	Glenton Brown	Liberal Democrat
2013	Glenton Brown	Liberal Democrat
2017	Barry Jordan	Conservative
2021	Seat abolished	

== Extent ==
Tintagel represented the villages of Tintagel, Boscastle, Bossiney, Warbstow, Otterham and Treknow, and the hamlets of Treven, Trewarmett, Trebarwith, Penpethy, Halgabron, Trevillet, Lesnewth, Tresparrett, Marshgate and part of Slaughterbridge. The division was affected by boundary changes at the 2013 election. From 2009 to 2013, the division covered 9,432 hectares in total; after the boundary changes in 2013, it covered 9,000 hectares.

== Election results ==
2017 election
Party	Candidate	Votes	%	±%
Conservative	Barry Jordan	611	40.1	
Liberal Democrats	John Lamb	599	39.3	
Independent	Peter Dyer	310	20.3	
Majority		12	0.8	
Rejected ballots		5	0.3	
Turnout		1525	48.2	
Conservative gain from Liberal Democrats		Swing		

2013 election
Party	Candidate	Votes	%	±%
Liberal Democrats	Glenton Brown	664	56.7	
UKIP	Susan Bowen	313	26.7	
Conservative	Paul Charlesworth	185	15.4	
Majority		351	29.9	
Rejected ballots		10	0.9	
Turnout		1172	36.4	
Liberal Democrats hold		Swing		

2009 election
Party	Candidate	Votes	%	±%
Liberal Democrats	Glenton Brown	716	44.3	
Independent	Anthony Brewer	449	27.8	
Conservative	Paul Heath	435	26.9	
Majority		267	16.5	
Rejected ballots		16	1.0	
Turnout		1616	47.5	
Liberal Democrats win (new seat)				
