= St Michael and All Angels' Church, Lesnewth =

Church in Cornwall, England

St Michael and All Angels’ Church, Lesnewth
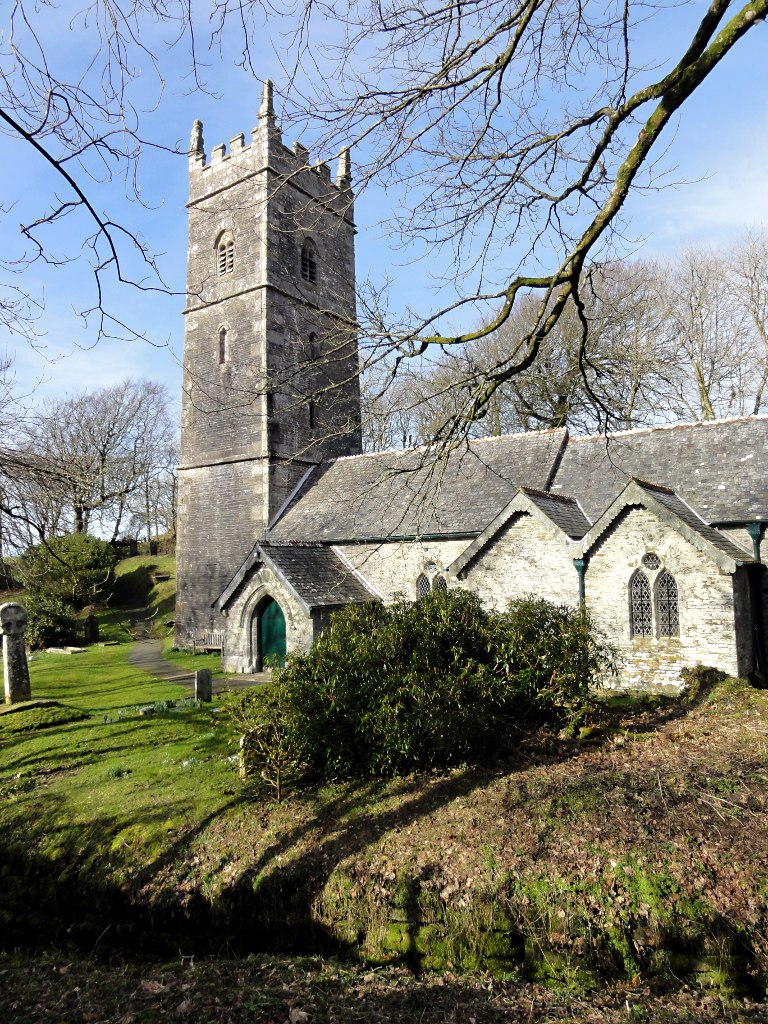
- St Michael and All Angels’ Church, Lesnewth
- St Michael and All Angels’ Church, Lesnewth
- 50°40′54.17″N 4°38′51.09″W
- Location: Lesnewth
- Country: England
- Denomination: Church of England
- Churchmanship: Broad church

History
- Dedication: St Michael and All Angels

Administration
- Province: Province of Canterbury
- Diocese: Diocese of Truro
- Archdeaconry: Bodmin
- Deanery: Stratton
- Parish: Lesnewth (Boscastle and Tintagel Group of Churches)

Listed Building – Grade II*
- Official name: Church of St Michael
- Designated: 17 December 1962
- Reference no.: 1327721

St Michael and All Angels’ Church, Lesnewth is a Grade II* listed parish church in the Church of England in Lesnewth, Cornwall.

== History ==
The church dates from the 12th century. With the exception of the tower, it was rebuilt between 1865 and 1866 by James Piers St Aubyn at a cost of £700. The contractor was Westlake and Cann.

== Parish status ==
The church is in the Boscastle and Tintagel group of parishes which includes:

- St Symphorian's Church, Forrabury
- St Merteriana's Church, Minster
- St Materiana's Church, Tintagel
- St Denis’ Church, Otterham
- St Julitta's Church, St Juliot
- The Holy Family Church, Treknow
- St Piran's Church, Trethevy
- St Petroc's Church, Trevalga
