= St Julitta's Church, St Juliot =

Church in Cornwall, England

St Julitta’s Church, St Juliot
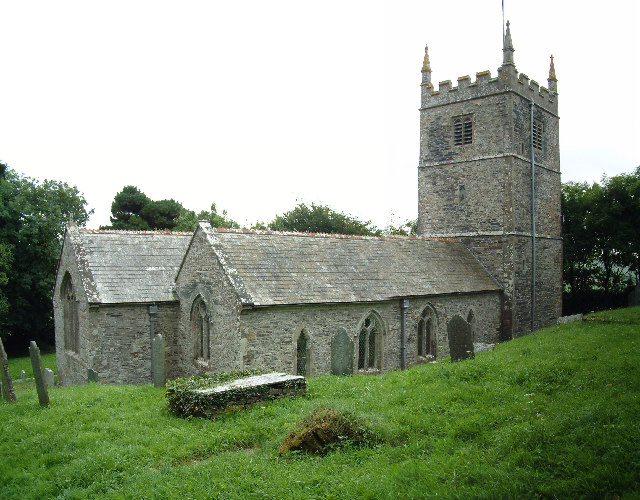
- St Julitta’s Church, St Juliot
- St Julitta’s Church, St Juliot
- 50°41′34.51″N 4°39′11.7″W
- Location: St Juliot
- Country: England
- Denomination: Church of England
- Churchmanship: Broad church

History
- Dedication: St Julitta

Architecture
- Designated: 17 December 1962

Administration
- Province: Province of Canterbury
- Diocese: Diocese of Truro
- Archdeaconry: Bodmin
- Deanery: Stratton
- Parish: St Juliot (Boscastle and Tintagel Group of Churches)

Listed Building – Grade II*
- Official name: Church of St Julitta
- Designated: 17 December 1962
- Reference no.: 1222833

St Julitta's Church, St Juliot is a Grade II* listed parish church in the Church of England Diocese of Truro in St Juliot, Cornwall. (St Julitta's Church, Lanteglos-by-Camelford is dedicated to the same local saint.)

== History ==
The parish church is dedicated to St Julitta (Juliot) and stands in an isolated location above the valley of the River Valency at grid reference SX 129 912 The parish church of Lanteglos by Camelford and the castle chapel at Tintagel are also dedicated to St Julitta. The church is in the St Juliot civil parish of northeast Cornwall,

The church predates the Domesday Book. The Dark Ages church building was enlarged in the 13th century when transepts were added

The chapel of St Julitta was acquired in 1238 by the canons of St Stephens by Launceston and before 1269 was annexed to their church of St Gennys. In the late 15th century a south aisle and porch were added to the church.

At the Reformation it was separated from St Gennys and became a donative served by perpetual curates who were paid £7 annually. It became a rectory in 1865. There was formerly a north transept which was removed in the Victorian restoration.

The tower is of three stages; the south aisle is built of granite and has one additional bay east of the end of the nave. Features of interest include the vaulted granite south porch and a relief in bronze of the Deposition of Christ which is the work of an Italian 16th-century Mannerist. There are two Cornish crosses in the churchyard. The parish now belongs to the Boscastle group of Anglican parishes.

It was surveyed by the Dorchester architect John Hicks in 1867, but he died before restoration work could start. It was restored between 1870 and 1872 by Thomas Hardy. The restoration was almost a complete rebuilding, but controversial as to whether some of the original building could have been restored, rather than replaced. It re-opened on 25 April 1872.

As well as being an architect Hardy was better known as a poet and novelist. He met his wife here in 1870, and wrote A Pair of Blue Eyes and other poems in 1912–13, about his time in the parish.

There are three Cornish crosses of early dating. There are two Cornish crosses in the churchyard. One of the crosses was originally sited at Anderton Mill, Lesnewth, but was brought here for preservation in 1852.

== Parish status ==
The church is in the Boscastle and Tintagel group of parishes which includes:

- St Symphorian's Church, Forrabury
- St Merteriana's Church, Minster
- St Michael and All Angels' Church, Lesnewth
- St Denis' Church, Otterham
- St Materiana's Church, Tintagel
- St Piran's Church, Trethevy
- St Petroc's Church, Trevalga

== Bells ==
The tower contains a peal of 6 bells which as of 2009 were reported as being unringable. The tenor and treble are the youngest by John Taylor from 1951. Two date from 1808 by John III Pennington and the others are 1734 and 1783 by John IV Pennington.
