= Penpethy =

Coordinates: 50.645°N 4.709°W

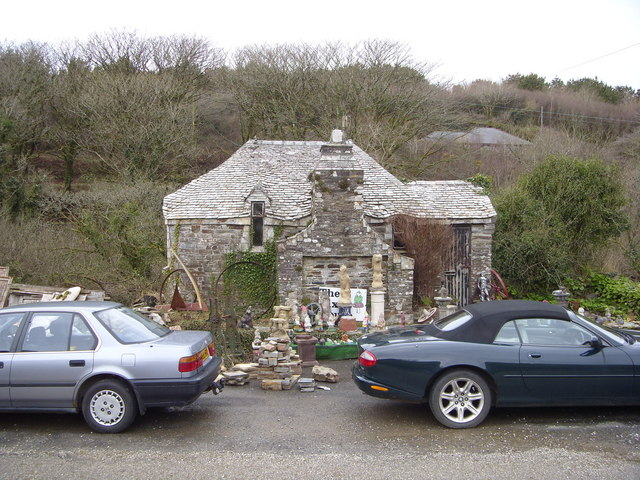
- The Pixie House at Penpethy

- Location within Cornwall
- Civil parish: Tintagel
- Unitary authority: Cornwall
- Ceremonial county: Cornwall
- Region: South West
- Country: England
- Sovereign state: United Kingdom
- Police: Devon and Cornwall
- Fire: Cornwall
- Ambulance: South Western

Penpethy is a hamlet in the parish of Tintagel, Cornwall, England. Penpethy is south of Condolden and east of Trebarwith Strand.
