= St Denis' Church, Otterham =

Church in Cornwall, England

St Denis’s Church, Otterham
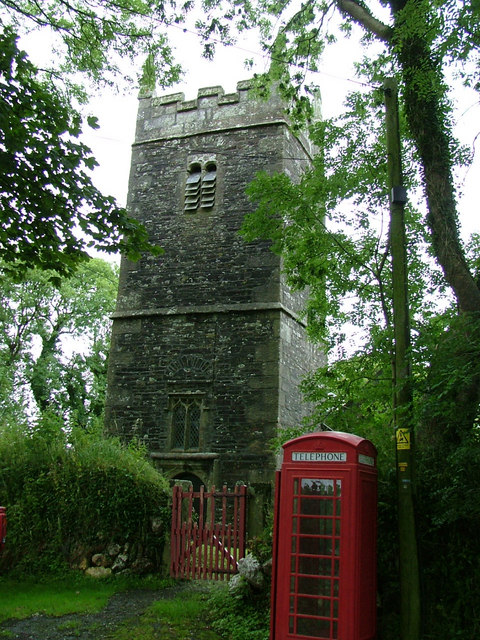
- St Denis’s Church, Otterham
- St Denis’s Church, Otterham
- 50°41′13.33″N 4°35′41.54″W
- Location: Otterham
- Country: England
- Denomination: Church of England
- Churchmanship: Broad church

History
- Dedication: St Denis

Administration
- Province: Province of Canterbury
- Diocese: Diocese of Truro
- Archdeaconry: Bodmin
- Deanery: Stratton
- Parish: Otterham (Boscastle and Tintagel Group of Churches)

Listed Building – Grade II*
- Official name: Church of St Denis
- Designated: 17 December 1962
- Reference no.: 1143456

St Denis's Church, Otterham is a Grade II* listed parish church in the Church of England Diocese of Truro in Otterham, Cornwall.

== History ==
The dedication to St. Denis is undocumented according to Charles G. Henderson who observes that nearby land was called St Tenye in 1613. (Other dedications to this saint in Cornwall are found at Trevena and North Tamerton.)

The church dates from the Norman period. The tower may have been rebuilt in 1702. The church was restored between 1889 and 1904; at which time the north transept was demolished and much old woodwork was removed.

== Parish status ==
The church is in the Boscastle and Tintagel group of parishes which includes

- St Symphorian's Church, Forrabury
- St Merteriana's Church, Minster
- St Materiana's Church, Tintagel
- St Michael and All Angel's Church, Lesnewth
- St Julitta's Church, St Juliot
- The Holy Family Church, Treknow
- St Piran's Church, Trethevy
- St Petroc's Church, Trevalga

== Bells & organ ==
The original 3 bells have been augmented to a peal of 6. The church used to have a harmonium, but the music is now played by an electric organ at the far right front of the church.
