= St Piran's Chapel, Trethevy =

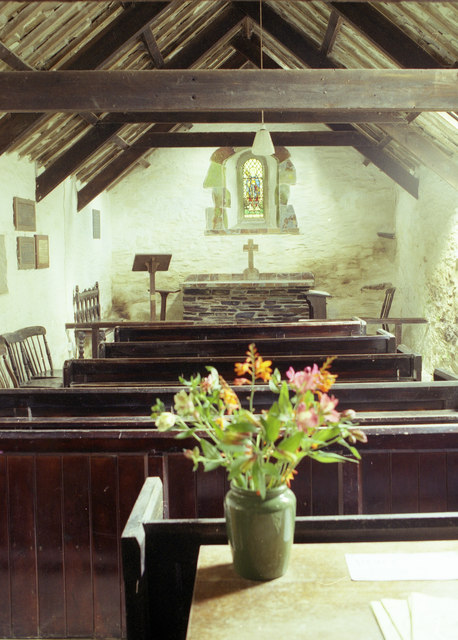
- Interior of St Piran's Chapel
- St Piran's Chapel, Trethevy
- 50.6701°N 4.7238°W
- OS grid reference: SX 0765 8915
- Denomination: Church of England
- Churchmanship: High Church

History
- Dedication: St Piran

Administration
- Province: Canterbury
- Diocese: Truro
- Archdeaconry: Bodmin
- Deanery: Trigg Minor
- Parish: Tintagel

Clergy
- Priest: Rev. John Barfett

Saint Piran's Chapel is a long, single storey slate construction in the hamlet of Trethevy in the parish of Tintagel, Cornwall, UK. It is a chapel-of-ease in the Anglican parish of Tintagel.

== History ==
The chapel's earliest recorded mention is in May 1457 when Parson John Gregory had a licence to celebrate mass in the Chapels of St Piran and St Denys (the latter being at Trevena). The building was used for farm purposes after the Reformation. A field above the building, Chapel Meadow, was named on the Tithe map, 1841.

Until the early twentieth century a massive stone altar slab was in position and the old arched oak door frame of the south door (now built up but traceable), was still to be seen. A stone coffin was found in July 1944 by Father Edward Arundell, vicar of Tintagel. The body was buried with the feet towards the west, suggesting that it may have been that of a priest. Until its theft in 1993, a granite Norman lamp was displayed in the chapel. At some point in the late 19th century, the walls were lowered.

It is unclear why there should be a chapel dedicated to Saint Piran so far from the concentration of places associated with him to the west of the county but the Domesday Book mentions the ‘monks of St. Pieran’ who owned the manor of Tregrebri in this part of Cornwall (this can plausibly be identified with Tregenver, a farmstead near Trethevy).

In 1941 the owner of the building, Sidney Harris, gave it back to the Church of England. The chapel was restored by Father Arundell and builder George Climo. The first mass was celebrated there on 8 February 1944. Sidney Harris died in hospital later that day.

Occasional services are still held in the chapel.

Other chapels bore St.Piran's name, including that according to Giraldus Cambrensis standing in the road in front of Cardiff Castle where Henry II was the recipient of a vision precluding Sunday markets.

== Features of the chapel ==
A small lancet window with a trefoil head remains in the east wall and what appears to be a rough stone shelf or piscina is on the south side. On the north wall there is also a more recent stained glass window (1940s?) representing Saint Piran, standing in the Rocky Valley.

== Parish status ==
The church is in the Boscastle and Tintagel group of parishes which includes:

- St Symphorian's Church, Forrabury
- St Merteriana's Church, Minster
- St Michael and All Angels' Church, Lesnewth
- St Denis' Church, Otterham
- St Julitta's Church, St Juliot
- St Materiana's Church, Tintagel
- The Holy Family Church, Treknow
- St Petroc's Church, Trevalga
