= Harry Cann =

English footballer

Personal information
- Full name: Harry Cann
- Date of birth: 31 March 1905
- Place of birth: Tintagel, England
- Date of death: 1980 (aged 74–75)
- Height: 5 ft 11 in (1.80 m)
- Position: Goalkeeper

Senior career*
Years	Team	Apps	(Gls)
–	Tintagel		
1927–1939	Plymouth Argyle	225	(0)
1939–19??	Fulham	0	(0)
- * Club domestic league appearances and goals

Harry Cann (31 March 1905 – 1980) was an English professional footballer who made 225 appearances in the Football League playing as a goalkeeper for Plymouth Argyle.

Cann was born in Tintagel, Cornwall. He played for his local club (Tintagel A.F.C.) before joining Plymouth Argyle in 1927. He made his debut in the Football League towards the end of the 1927–28 season and took over from Fred Craig as first-choice goalkeeper the following year. He joined Fulham on a free transfer in 1939. The Second World War put an end to his League career, but he played for Fulham in the 1939–40 season of the wartime competitions, and also featured as a guest for West Ham United.

His brother, Leonard Cann, was also a goalkeeper for Tintagel and once appeared in a Southern League game for Argyle while on trial with the reserve team.
