= Tintagel =

Village in Cornwall, England

Coordinates: 50.663°N 4.750°W

Tintagel: Cornish: Tre war Venydh; Trevena
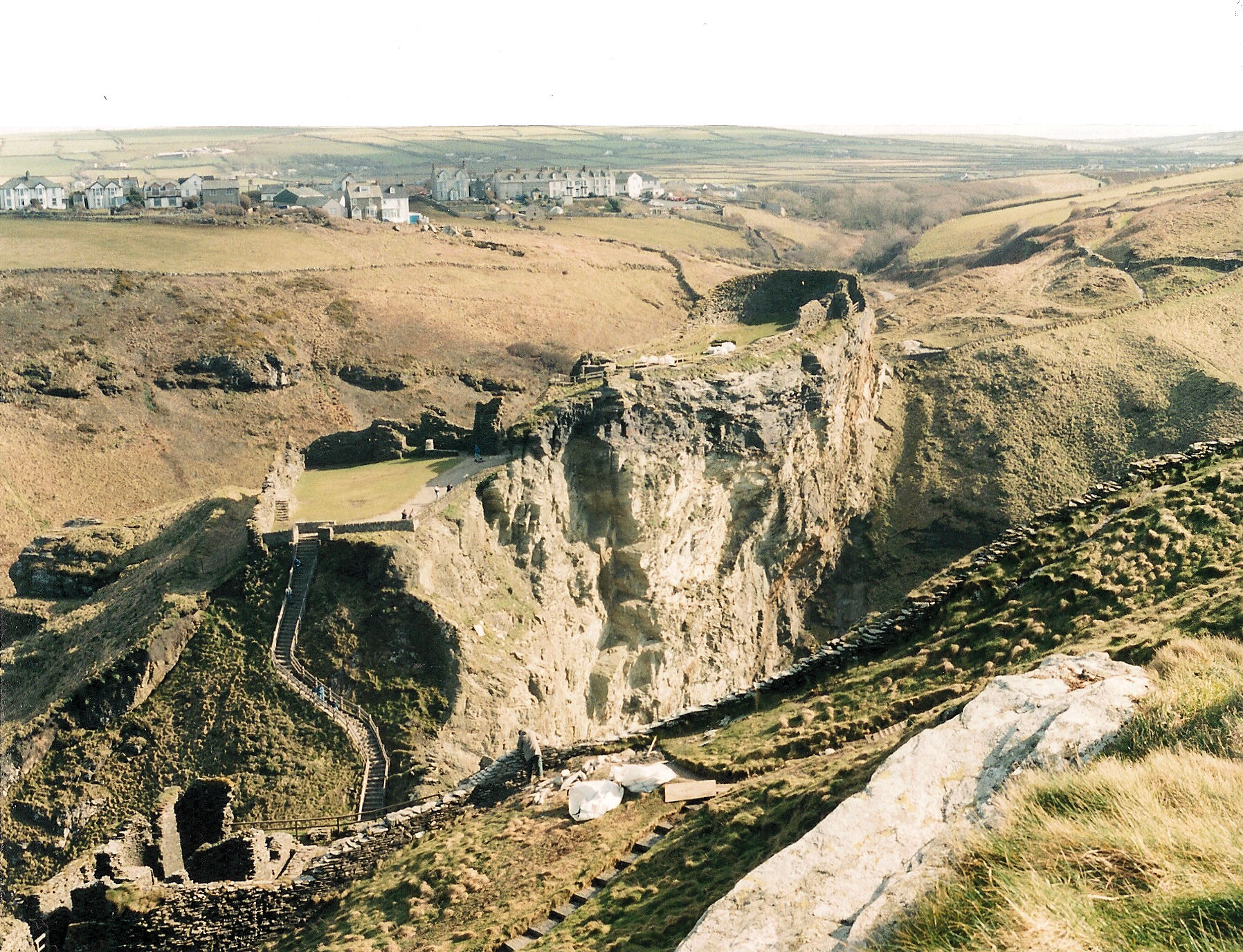
- Part of Trevena (above) and Tintagel Castle (below) in 1992

- Location within Cornwall
- Population: 1,782 (United Kingdom Census 2011 including Bossiney and Knightsmill)
- OS grid reference: SX057884
- Civil parish: Tintagel
- Unitary authority: Cornwall Council
- Ceremonial county: Cornwall
- Region: South West
- Country: England
- Sovereign state: United Kingdom
- Post town: TINTAGEL
- Postcode district: PL34
- Dialling code: 01840
- Police: Devon and Cornwall
- Fire: Cornwall
- Ambulance: South Western
- UK Parliament: North Cornwall

Tintagel (/tɪnˈtædʒəl/) or Trevena (Cornish: Tre war Venydh, meaning Village on a Mountain) is a civil parish and village situated on the Atlantic coast of Cornwall, England, United Kingdom. The village and nearby Tintagel Castle are associated with the legends surrounding King Arthur and in recent times have become a tourist attraction. It was claimed by Geoffrey of Monmouth that the castle was the place of Arthur's conception.

== Toponymy ==
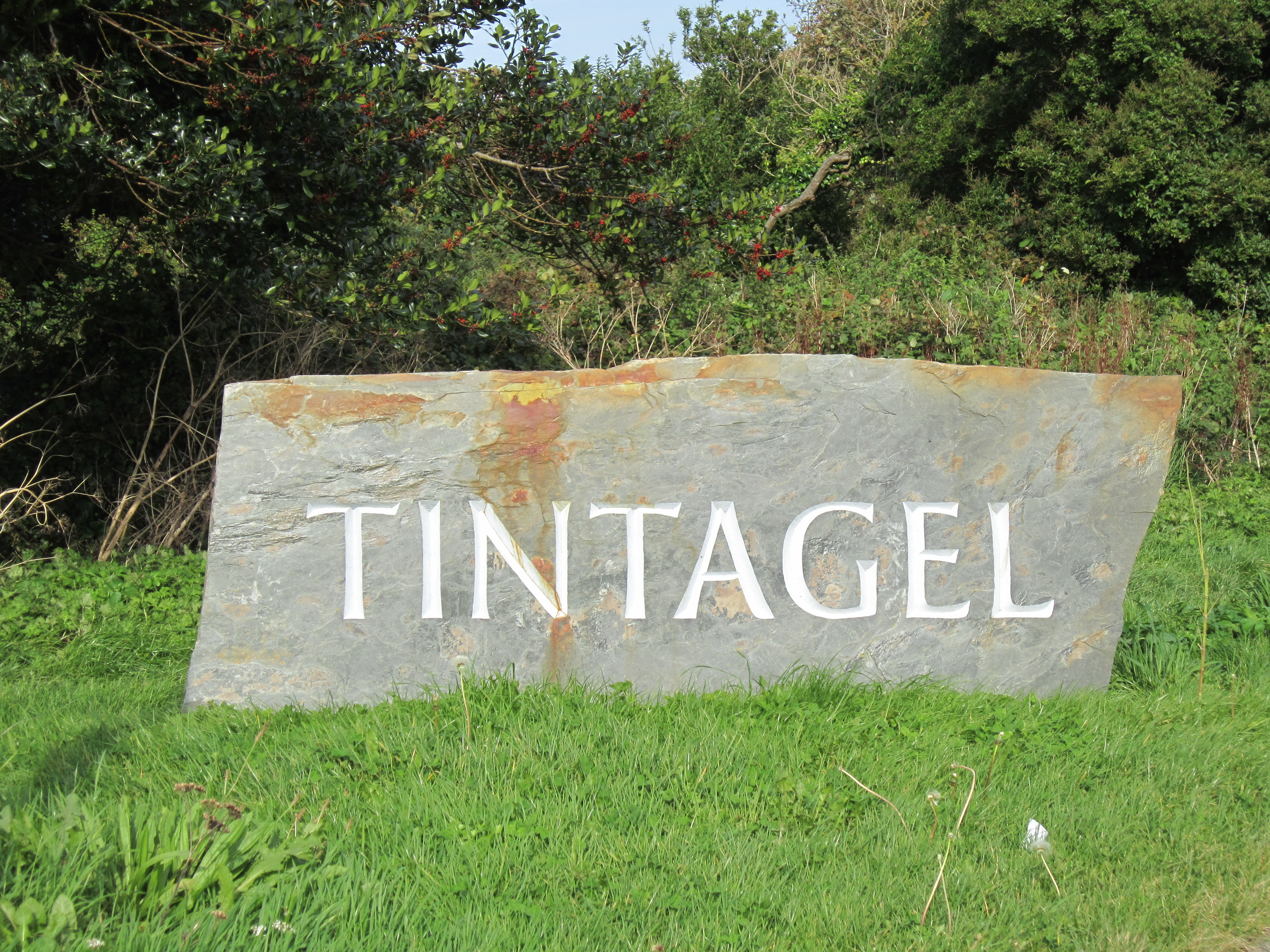
"Tintagel" sign

Toponymists have had difficulty explaining the origin of 'Tintagel': the probability is that it is Norman French, as the Cornish of the 13th century would have lacked the soft 'g' ('i/j' in the earliest forms: see also Tintagel Castle). If it is Cornish then 'Dun' would mean Fort. Oliver Padel proposes 'Dun' '-tagell' meaning narrow place in his book on place-names. There is a possible cognate in the Channel Islands named Tente d'Agel, but that still leaves the question subject to doubt.

The name first occurs in Geoffrey of Monmouth's Historia Regum Britanniae (c. 1136, in Latin) as Tintagol, implying pronunciation with a hard [g] sound as in modern English girl. But in Layamon's Brut (MS Cotton Otho C.xi, f. 482), in early Middle English, the name is rendered as Tintaieol. The letter i in this spelling implies a soft consonant like modern English j; the second part of the name would be pronounced approximately as -ageul would be in modern French.

An oft-quoted Celtic etymology in the Oxford Dictionary of English Place-Names, accepts the view of Padel (1985) that the name is from Cornish *din meaning fort and *tagell meaning neck, throat, constriction, narrow (Celtic *dūn, "fort" = Irish dún, "fort", cf. Welsh dinas, "city"; *tagell = Welsh tagell, "gill, wattle").

The modern-day village of Tintagel was always known as Trevena (Cornish: Tre war Venydh) until the Post Office started using 'Tintagel' as the name in the mid-19th century. Until then, 'Tintagel' had been restricted to the name of the headland and of the parish.

== Area and population ==
Treknow is the largest of the other settlements in the Tintagel parish, which also include Bossiney, Truas, Trebarwith, Tregatta, Trenale, Trethevy, Treven, Trevillet, and Trewarmett. The population of the entire parish was 1,725 at the 2021 census, and 1,727 at the 2011 census, down from 1,820 people at the 2001 census, and the area of the parish is 4,281 acres (17.32 km^{2}). (The population recorded in the 2011 census was 1,782 but this includes Knightsmill in the parish of St Teath.)

An electoral ward also exists extending inland to Otterham. The population of this ward at the same census was 3,990.

== History and government ==
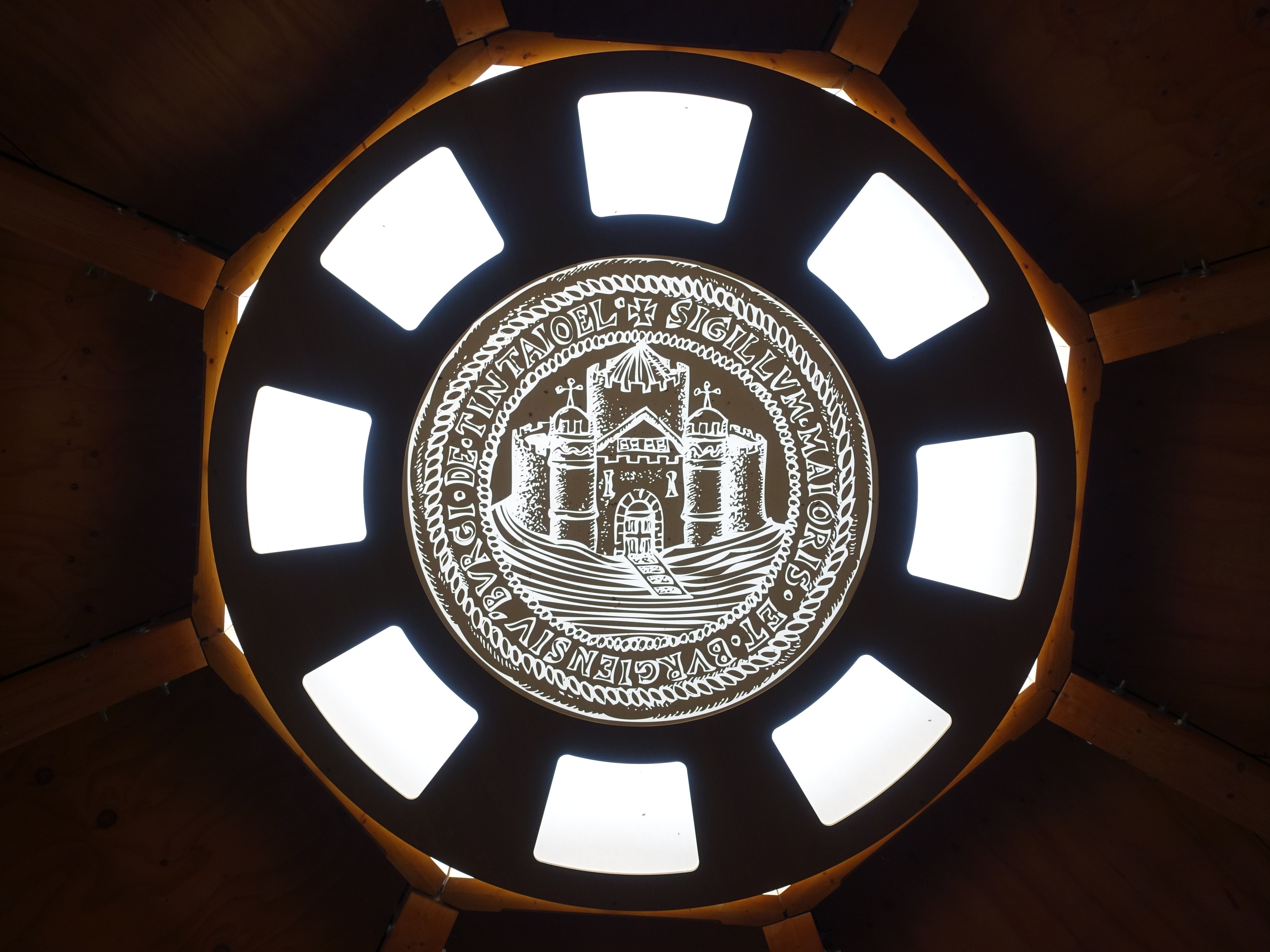
Borough seal (Tintagel Visitor Centre, Bossiney Road)

A small cliff castle was established at Bossiney in Norman times, probably before the Domesday Survey of 1086. In Domesday Book, there are certainly two manors in this parish, a probable third being Trethevy.

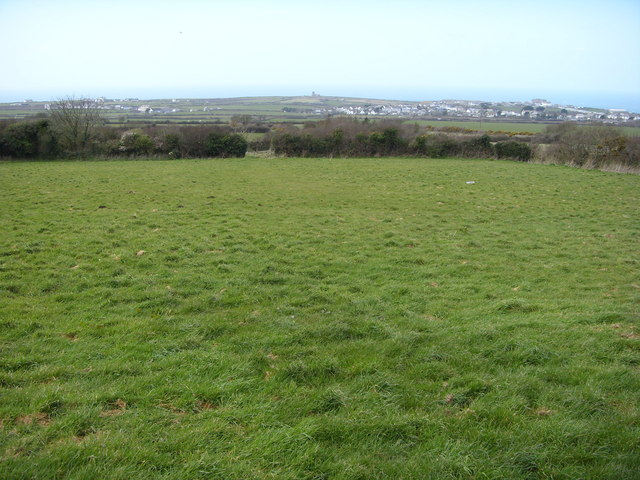
View of Treknow, Tintagel (Trevena), and Bossiney from King's Down

Bossiney and Trevena were established as a borough in 1253 by Richard, 1st Earl of Cornwall. Bossiney, which included Trevena, was held from the monks of Bodmin by the Earl of Cornwall. There was land for six ploughs and 30 acres (750 acres; 300 ha) of pasture. Before the Conquest, it had been held from the monks by Alfwy. The monks of Bodmin held Treknow themselves. There was land for eight ploughs and 100 acres (1,060 acres; 430 ha) of pasture. Tintagel was one of the 17 Antiqua maneria of the Duchy of Cornwall. The parish feast traditionally celebrated at Tintagel was 19 October, the feast day of St Denys, patron of the chapel at Trevena. The proper date is 9 October, but the feast was moved forward due to the calendar reform of 1752. The market hall and the site of the fair were near the chapel.

Tintagel (Trevena) declined towards the end of the medieval period for it was ill-equipped to take up fishing as an alternative occupation. Paradoxically it now enjoys a temporary prosperity as a result of tourist interest in the castle which was converted so romantically by Geoffrey of Monmouth into an ancient residence of King Arthur.

The Tithe Commissioners' survey was carried out in 1840–41 and recorded the area of the parish as 4,280 acres (1,730 ha), of which arable and pasture land was 3,200 acres (1,300 ha). The land owned by the largest landowner, Lord Wharncliffe, amounted to 1,814 acres (734 ha), and there was 125 acres (51 ha) of glebe land. Precise details of the size and tenure of every piece of land are given. Sidney Madge did research into the history of the parish and compiled a manuscript Records of Tintagel in 1945. The villages of Trevena and Bossiney were until the early 20th century separated by fields along Bossiney Road.

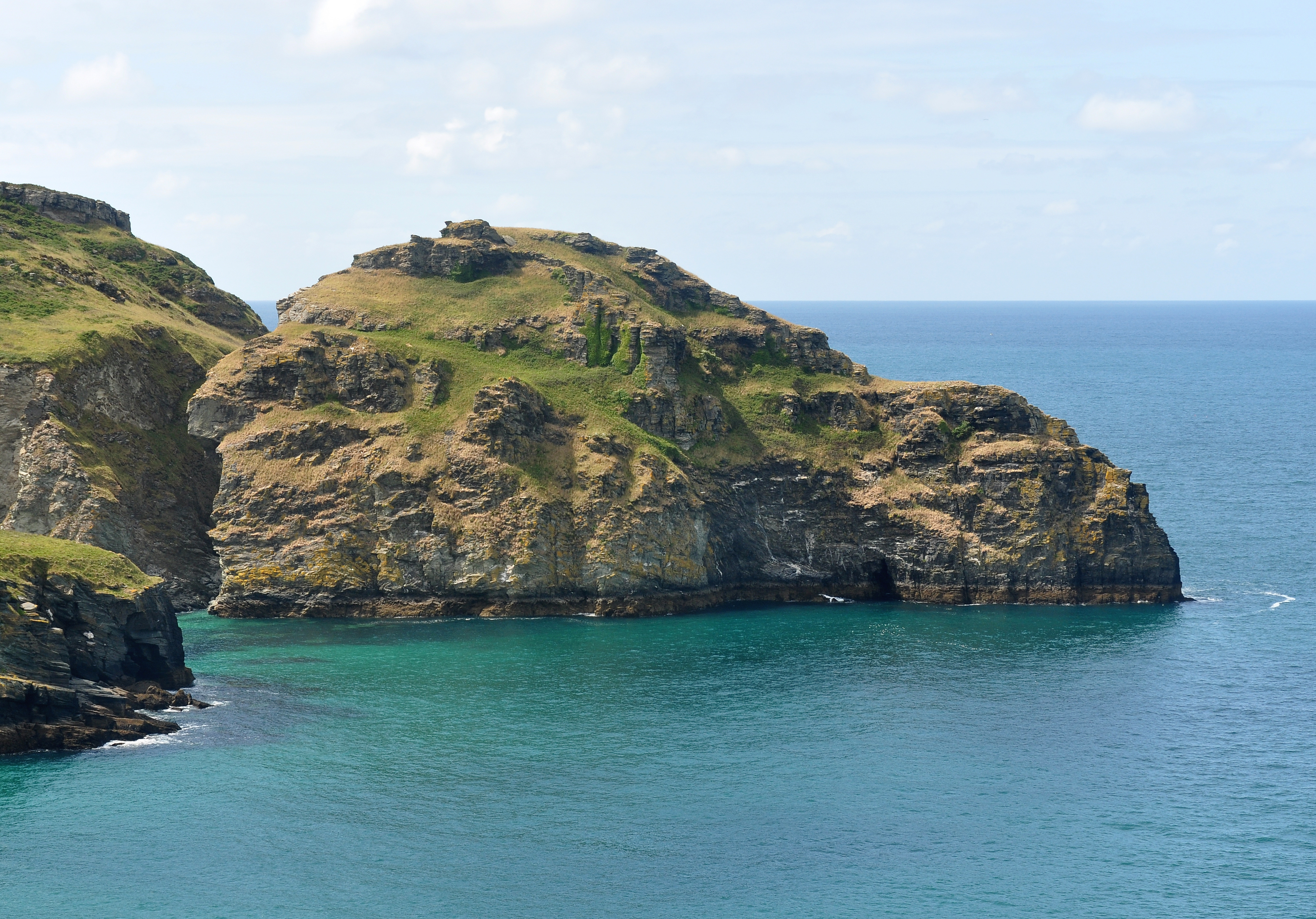
Lye Rock near Bossiney, site of the Iota shipwreck

Trebarwith was the scene of the shipwreck of the Sarah Anderson in 1886, where all aboard perished, but the most famous of the wrecks happened on 20 December 1893 at Lye Rock, when the barque Iota was driven against the cliff. The crew were able to get onto the rock and, apart from a youth of 14, were saved by four men, three of which were from Tintagel. One of these, Charles Hambly, received a Vellum testimonial and three medals for bravery afterwards. The story is told in verse by Joseph Brown in his 1897 poem Musings on Tintagel and its Heroes. The youth was buried in Tintagel Churchyard and the grave is marked by a wooden cross. His name is given in the bureaucratic Italian usage, surname first: Catanese Domenico. On 6 July 1979, Tintagel was briefly subject to national attention when an RAF Hawker Hunter fighter aircraft crashed into the village following an engine malfunction. The unusual incident caused significant damage and consternation, but no deaths.

The borough of Bossiney was given the right to send two MPs to Parliament c. 1552 and continued to do so until 1832 when its status as a borough was abolished. For the purposes of local government, Tintagel is currently a civil parish and councillors are elected every four years. The principal local authority in this area is Cornwall Council, but until March 2009 the parish was in the area of North Cornwall District Council. Parish council minutes can be found on Tintagel Web. From 1894 to 1974, the parish was in the Camelford Rural District.

== Arthurian legend ==
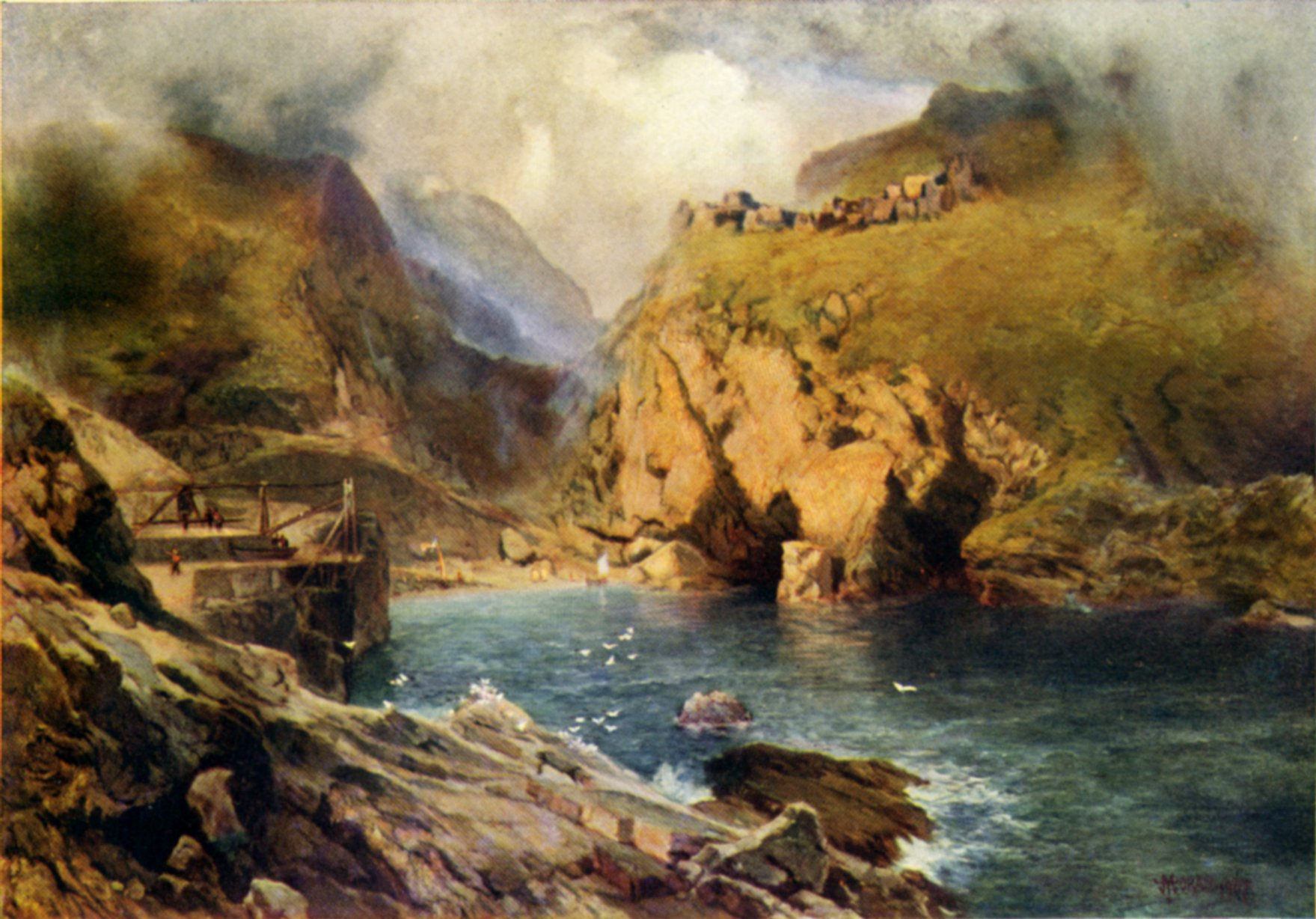
King Arthur's Castle (artist unknown, c. 1910); below the castle is Tintagel Haven with the equipment for loading slate.

As described in Geoffrey's popular Historia, Gorlois, Duke of Cornwall, put his wife Igraine in Tintagol while he was at war (posuit eam in oppido Tintagol in littore maris: "he put her in the oppidum Tintagol on the shore of the sea"). Merlin disguised Uther Pendragon as Gorlois so that Uther could enter Tintagel and impregnate Igraine while pretending to be Gorlois; Uther and Igraine's child was King Arthur. This motif became the standard origin story of Arthur in subsequent medieval chronicles and chivalric romances. In modern era, the association of Tintagel with Arthur's birthplace was popularised by Alfred, Lord Tennyson in Idylls of the King.

Some events of the Tristan and Iseult legend are also set at Tintagel. Modern works such as Algernon Charles Swinburne's Tristram of Lyonesse and Thomas Hardy's The Famous Tragedy of the Queen of Cornwall at Tintagel in Lyonnesse perpetuated that association.

Tourists can visit King Arthur's Great Halls at Trevena which is a substantial building of the early 1930s. The Artognou stone, which was discovered in 1998, has added to the legend, although historians do not believe the inscription refers to King Arthur.

== Archaeology and architecture ==
The Ravenna Cosmography, of around 700, makes reference to Purocoronavis (almost certainly a corruption of Durocornovium), 'a fort or walled settlement of the Cornovii': the location is unidentified, but Tintagel and Carn Brea have both been suggested. If this is correct then it would have been on the site of Tintagel Castle. Excavations around Tintagel Castle have supported the notion of trade goods there, with ships from along the Atlantic Coast and the Mediterranean Sea bringing pots carrying wine or oil, in the Early medieval period. The site appeared to be one of the places where a local king or warlord, perhaps of Dumnonia, and his entourage settled for a time, and traded with ships arriving from those far ports.

=== Excavations ===
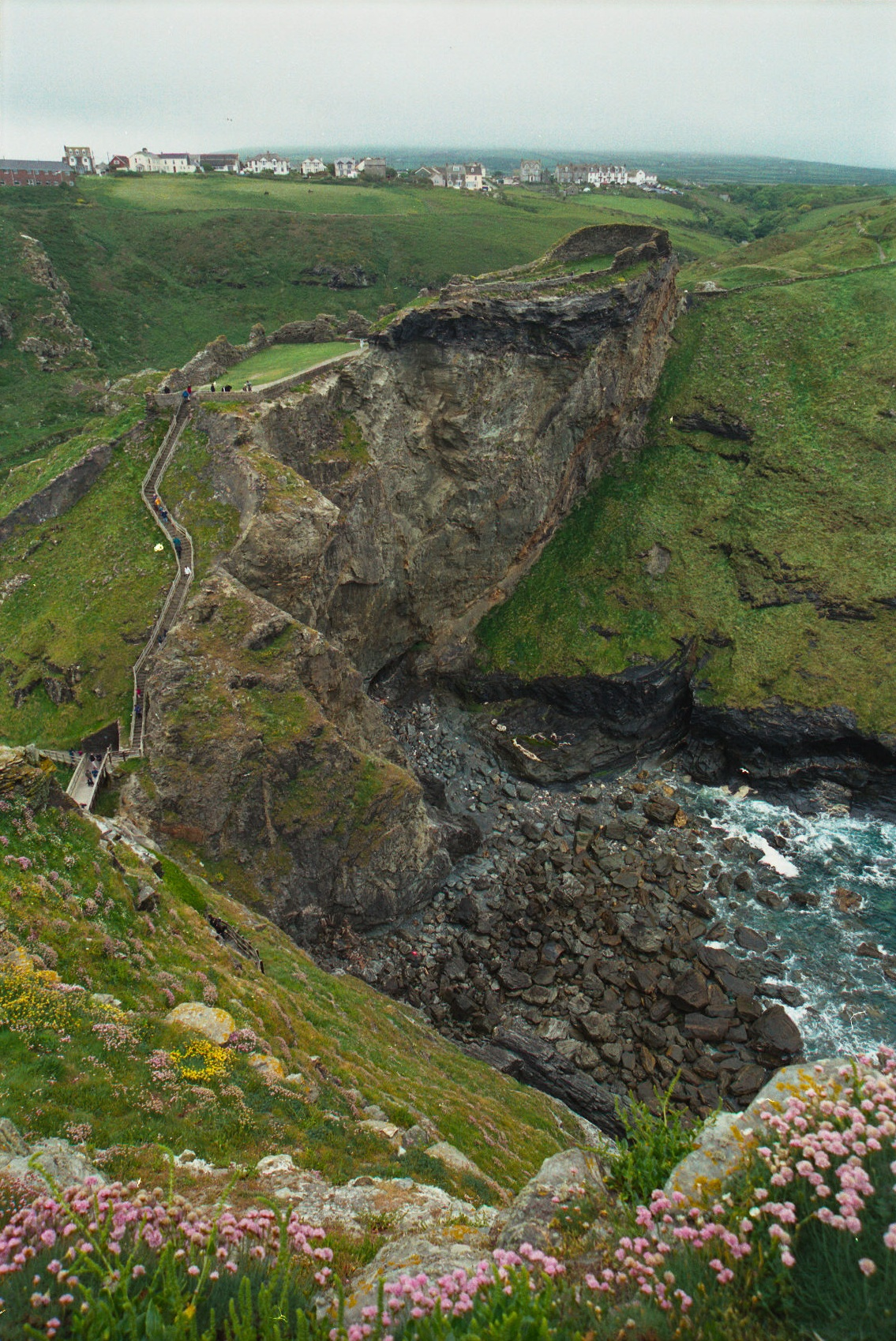
Overlooking the ruins of Tintagel Castle. Part of the village of Tintagel (Trevena) can be seen in the distance.

Major excavations beginning with C. A. Ralegh Radford's work in the 1930s on and around the site of the 12th-century castle have revealed that Tintagel headland was the site of either a high status Celtic monastery (according to Ralegh Radford) or a princely fortress as well as trading settlement dating to the 5th and 6th centuries (according to later excavators), in the period immediately following the withdrawal of the Romans from Britain. Finds of Mediterranean oil and wine jars show that Sub-Roman Britain was not the isolated outpost it was previously considered to be, for an extensive trade in high-value goods was taking place at the time with the Mediterranean region.

Finds from the excavations are preserved at the Royal Cornwall Museum in Truro. In 1998, excavations discovered the Artognou stone, which has added to Tintagel's Arthurian lore, although historians do not believe the inscription refers to King Arthur. Two seasons of excavation work were undertaken in Tintagel churchyard in the early 1990s.

=== Antiquities ===
The largest of the Bronze Age barrows is at the highest point in the parish, Condolden, another is at Menadue, and there are a number of others along the cliffs. In the Iron Age there were probably fortifications at Willapark and Barras Head, and inland at Trenale Bury. Two of the Roman milestones found in Cornwall are at Tintagel (the earlier of the two is described under Trethevy: the later one was found in the walls of the churchyard in 1889 and is preserved in the church. The inscription can be read as '[I]mp C G Val Lic Licin' which would refer to the Emperor Licinius (d. 324).

There are many other relics of antiquity to be found here such as the so-called King Arthur's Footprint on the Island and a carved rock from Starapark which has been placed outside the Sir James Smith's School at Dark Lane, Camelford. Rodney Castleden has written about these as Bronze Age ritual objects. "King Arthur's Footprint" is a hollow in the rock at the highest point of Tintagel Island's southern side. It is not entirely natural, having been shaped by human hands at some stage. It may have been used for the inauguration of kings or chieftains as the site is known to have a long history stretching back to the Dark Ages. The name is probably a 19th-century invention by the castle guide.

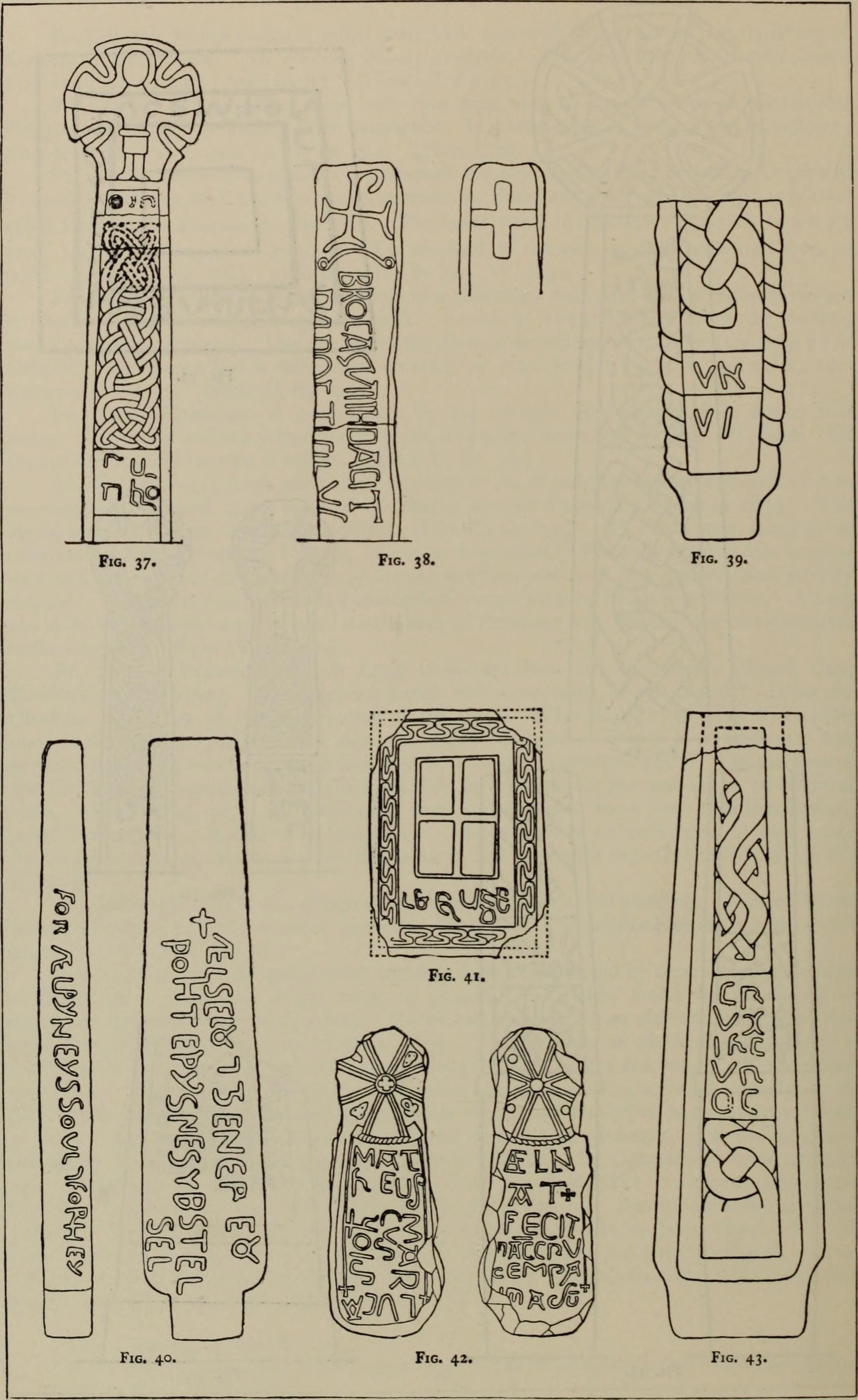
Illustration from The Victoria History of the County of Cornwall (1906); figure 42 in the bottom row shows the two sides of the "ornamented cross standing in garden in front of the Wharncliffe Arms Hotel"

Stone crosses, of which there are two, have both been moved from their original positions: the plainer of the two is Hendra cross (see Bossiney). Aelnat's cross which was found at Trevillet and then moved to the Wharncliffe Arms Hotel at Trevena, is finely carved. The inscription can be read as 'Aelnat fecit hanc crucem pro anima sua' (Ælnat made this cross for [the good of] his soul) – the back of the stone has the names of the four evangelists. The name of this man is Saxon, and together with Alfwy mentioned in 1086 he is the only Anglo-Saxon recorded in connection with the area. One of Thomas Hardy's poems, "By the runic stone" (1917) was interpreted by Evelyn Hardy as referring to Aelnat's cross.

=== Notable secular buildings ===
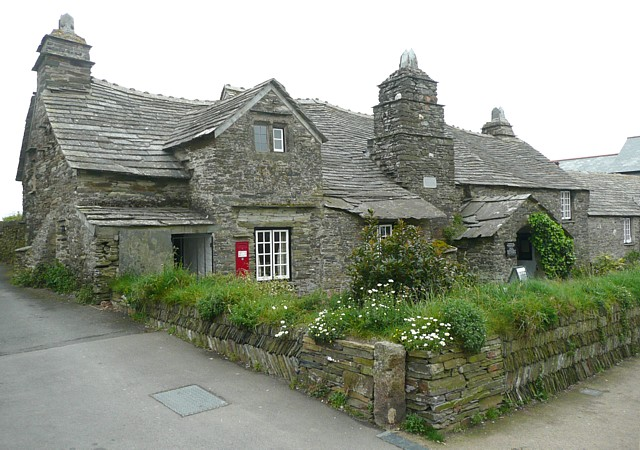
Tintagel Old Post Office in 2009

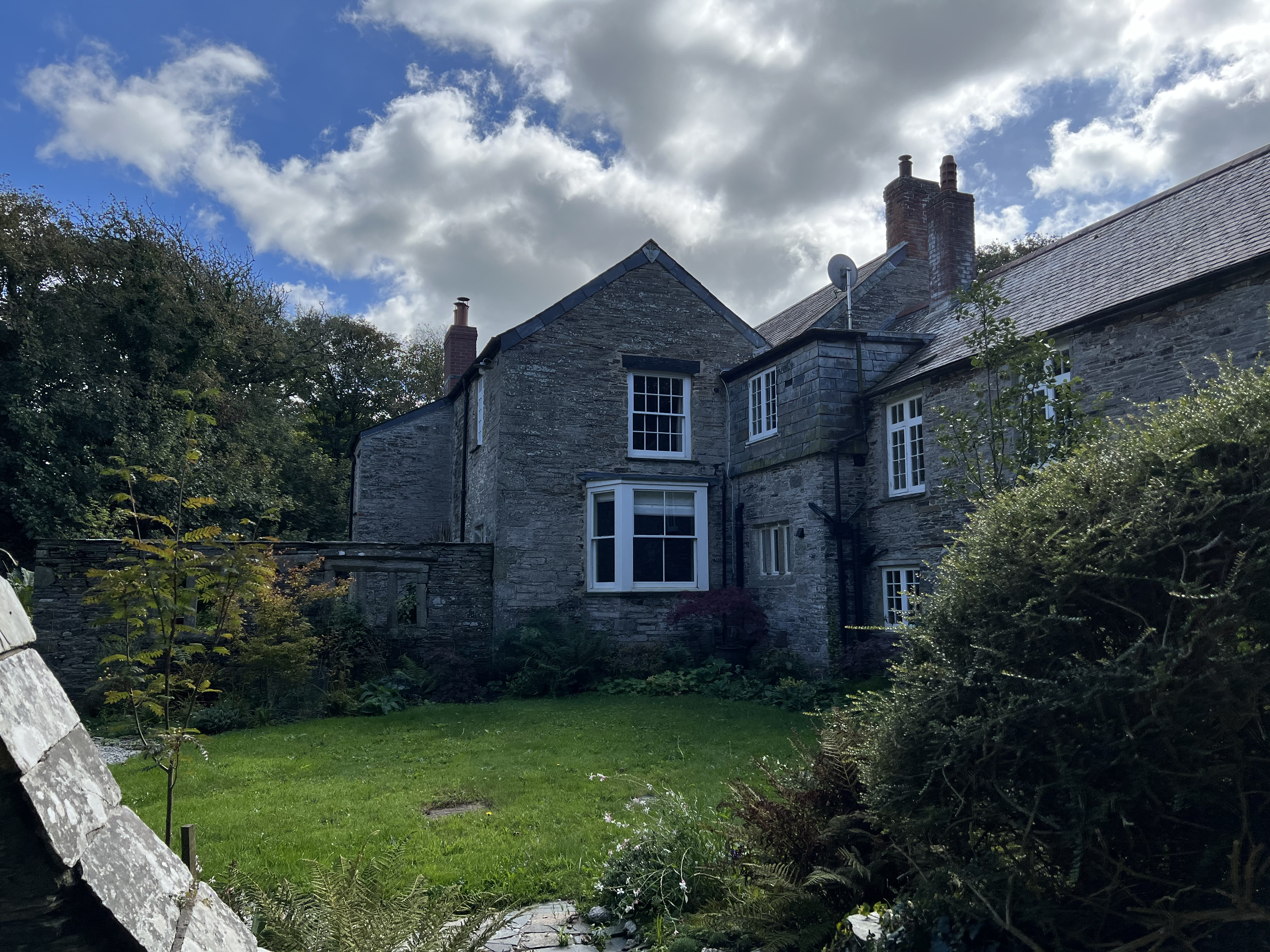
The Vicarage

The village has the Tintagel Old Post Office, which dates from the 14th century. It became a post office during the 19th century, and is now listed Grade I and owned by the National Trust.

Tintagel Primary School was built at Treven in 1914 to replace the old church school (founded 1874) and has been extended since. Those who go on to a comprehensive school attend Sir James Smith's School, Camelford. The Gift House was purchased by the Trustees of Tintagel Women's Institute from Catherine Johns and not donated as previously thought. It adjoins the Old Post Office.

The former Vicarage was built in the early 17th century and substantial additions were made in the late 18th and mid-19th centuries. In the grounds is Fontevrault Chapel and a columbarium which is one of the best preserved in Cornwall. The site and glebe lands were the home of the vicars as early as the mid-13th century when the benefice came into the hands of the Abbey of Fontevraud in Anjou, France. In 2008, the Diocese of Truro decided to acquire new accommodation for future vicars and to sell the vicarage.

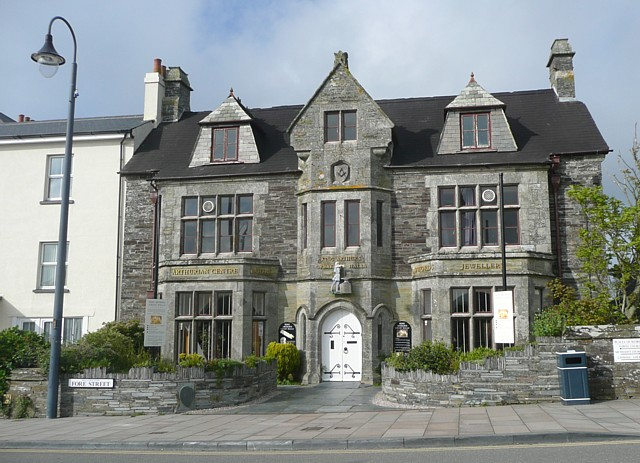
King Arthur's Great Halls in 2009

King Arthur's Great Halls at Trevena is a substantial building of the early 1930s. It was built for custard powder manufacturer F. T. Glasscock as the headquarters of the "Fellowship of the Knights of the Round Table", behind Trevena House. A variety of Cornish stones are used in the construction and the 73 stained glass windows illustrating the Arthurian tales are by Veronica Whall; there are several paintings of scenes from the life of King Arthur by William Hatherell. In 1927, the order of the Fellowship of the Knights of the Round Table of King Arthur was formed in Britain by Frederick Thomas Glasscock (a retired London businessman, d. 1934) to promote Christian ideals and Arthurian notions of medieval chivalry. Glasscock was resident at Tintagel (in the house "Eirenicon" which he had built) and responsible for the building of King Arthur's Hall (an extension of Trevena House which had been John Douglas Cook's residence and had been built on the site of the former Town Hall and Market Hall). The hall is now used as a Masonic Hall, and is home to four Masonic bodies.

=== Hotels ===
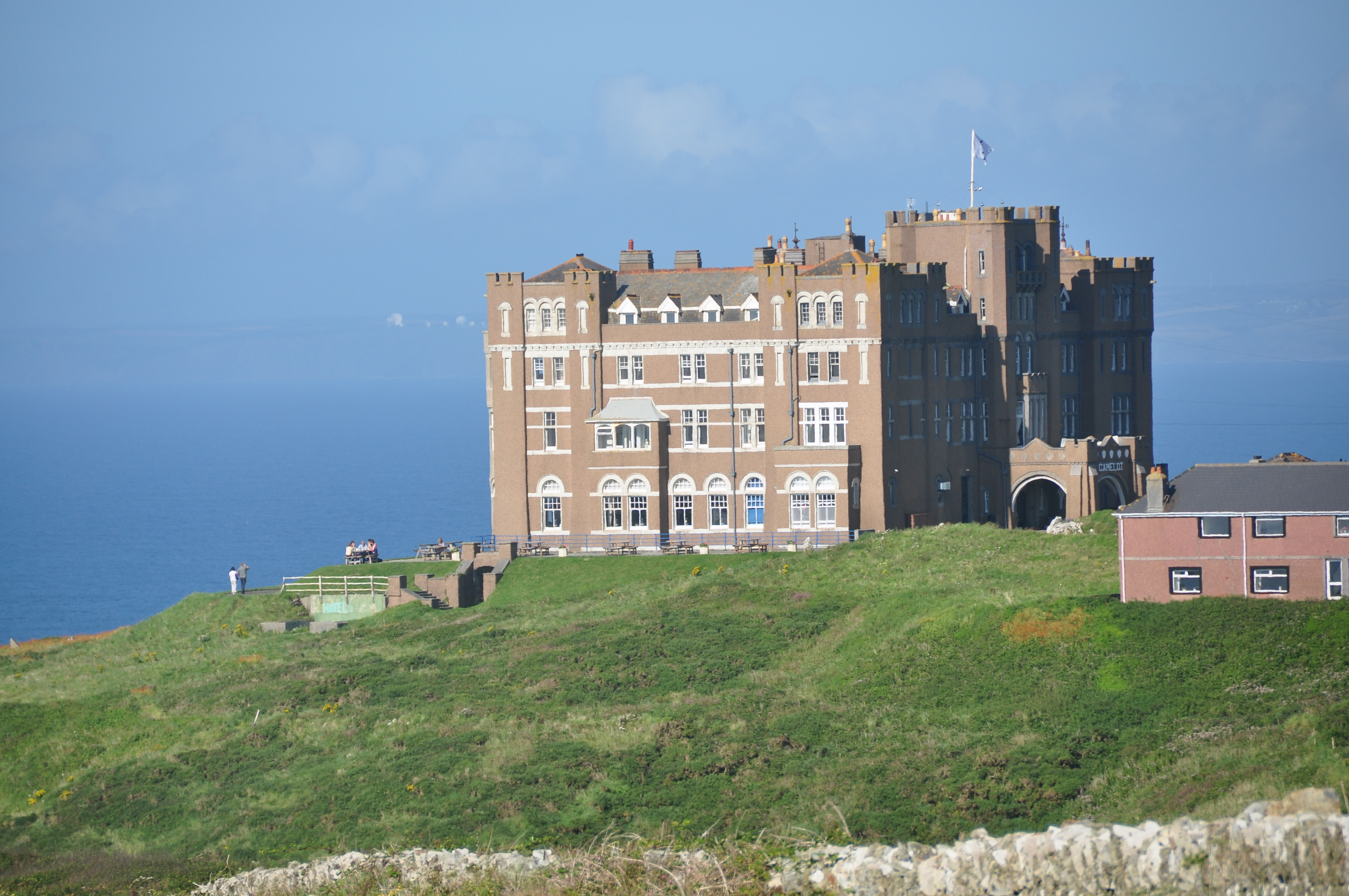
Camelot Castle Hotel in 2012

The King Arthur's Castle Hotel (now called Camelot Castle Hotel) was built in 1896 and opened in 1899 as an enterprise of Sir Robert Harvey and the architect was Silvanus Trevail. It was originally intended as the terminus hotel for a planned branch railway line from Camelford that was never built. The hotel stands alone on land previously known as Firebeacon. Its front has battered walls, a central entrance tower rising to five storeys and projecting four-storey corner towers; the towers have machicolations and rise above the three storeys of the rest of the building. The Great Hall on the first floor is designed around a replica of the Winchester Round Table and has Romanesque arcades with Italian marble piers. In 2010, an exposé of the hotel's business practices was broadcast by the BBC television programme Inside Out South West.

There were two hotels on Fore Street, Trevena: the Wharncliffe Hotel and the Tintagel Hotel. The Wharncliffe has now been converted into flats (next to the King Arthur's Hall): the Aelnat Cross (Hiberno-Saxon) stands in the grounds. It is named after the Earl of Wharncliffe who was the largest landowner in the parish until his holdings were sold at the beginning of the 20th century. Opposite the Wharncliffe is the former Tintagel Hotel, once commonly known as Fry's Hotel: this was the terminus for coaches in the days before the railway to Camelford Station and stands on the site of the medieval chapel of St Denys. Near Dunderhole Point on Glebe Cliff stands a building from the former slate quarry that has been used as Tintagel Youth Hostel (managed by YHA) for many years.

=== Churches and chapels ===
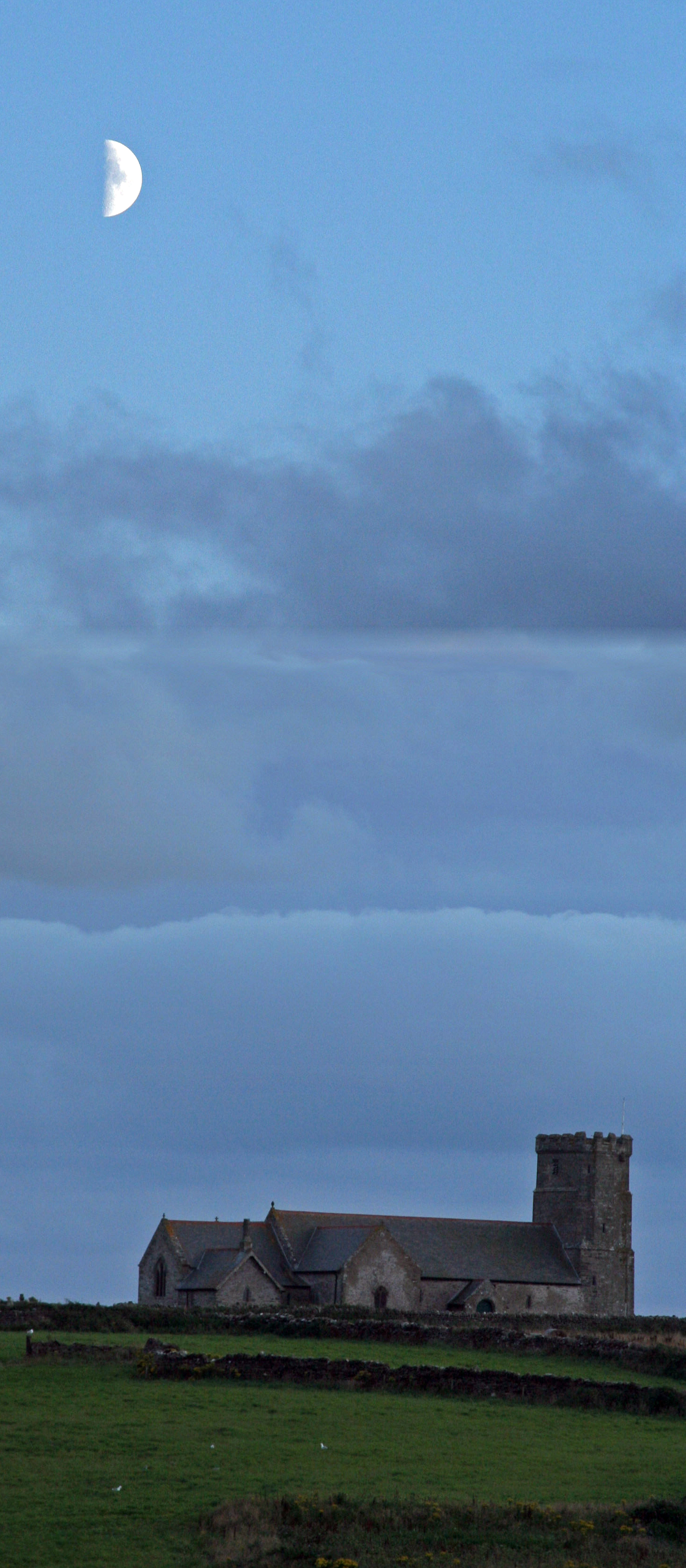
St Materiana's in 2008

The Church of St Materiana (Tintagel Parish Church) has been Anglican since the English Reformation. It was originally built in Norman times. Writing in 1951, Nikolaus Pevsner was uncertain about the dating and suggests that the Norman work has some Saxon features while the tower may be 13th or 15th century in date. It stands on the cliffs between Trevena and Tintagel Castle and is listed Grade I. The first church on the site was probably in the 6th century, founded as a daughter church of Minster: these are the only churches dedicated to St Materiana though she is usually identified with Madryn, Princess of Gwent. The existing church may be late 11th or early 12th century: the tower is some three centuries later and the most significant change since then was the restoration in 1870 by James Piers St Aubyn. An area of the churchyard was excavated in 1990–91 by the Cornwall Archaeological Unit. There are modern stained glass windows, three modern copies of Old Master paintings, and a Roman milestone (described above under Antiquities). The parish war memorial stands at the western end of the churchyard and a modern churchyard cross (c. 1910) near the south entrance.

There was a Norman chapel of St Julitta at the castle, now in ruins, which was excavated in Ralegh Radford's excavations. It is a simple rectangular building and the chancel is of a later date than the nave.

In the Middle Ages, there was also a chapel of St Denys at Trevena: the annual fair was therefore celebrated in the week of his feast day (19 October). From 1925 until 2008 part of the Vicarage outbuildings were also in use as a chapel (the Fontevrault Chapel). The name commemorates the abbey in France which held the patronage of Tintagel during the Middle Ages (the commune is now known as Fontevraud-l'Abbaye), founded by Robert of Arbrissel.

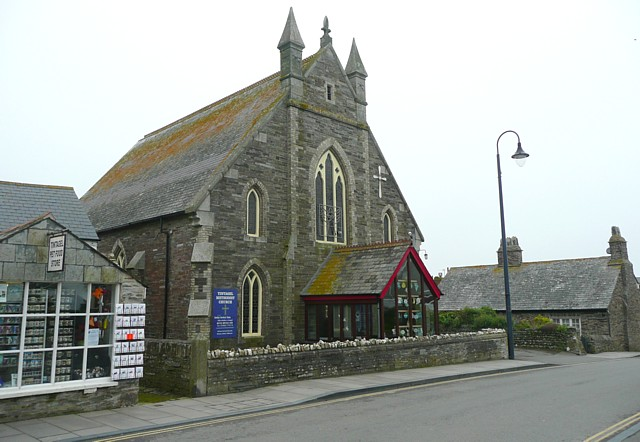
Trevena's Methodist Church in 2009

The Methodist Church has chapels at Trevena and Bossiney. Formerly there were more chapels of various Methodist sects (Wesleyans, Bible Christians), including at Trenale and Trewarmett: the Methodist Cemetery is at Trewarmett. Wesleyan Methodism in Tintagel began in 1807 at Trenale and over the next sixty years gained many adherents though divided among a number of sects (Wesleyan Methodist, Methodist Association, Bible Christian): chapels were built at Trevena in 1838 and Bossiney in 1860. In the 1830s and 1840s, the Camelford Wesleyan Methodist circuit, which included Tintagel, underwent a secession by more than half the members to the Wesleyan Methodist Association. The various Methodist churches were united again by the agreements of 1907 and 1932. Mary Toms, a Bible Christian from Tintagel, evangelised parts of the Isle of Wight.

St Paul's Church, Tintagel has a thirty-thousand piece mosaic of the saint within its walls. Since January 2008, when the church celebrated its 40th anniversary, a modern-day version of Leonardo da Vinci's The Last Supper by local artist Nicholas St John Rosse has hung above the main altar in the church. It has made international headlines due to its use of modern clothing and local people as the apostles. People from many other countries also come to Tintagel to view the names of their babies who have been lost due to miscarriage, stillbirth or other cause. The names are recorded in the Miscarriage & Infant Loss Memorial Book which is kept at the church.

At Trethevy is the Anglican St Piran's Chapel. Another Anglican chapel (the church of the Holy Family) is at Treknow.

=== Quarrying ===
The extensive Tintagel Slate Quarries are largely responsible for the jagged coastline south of Tintagel and stretch all the way to Trebarwith Strand. The quarries were worked from the fifteenth until the early twentieth centuries. The slate was mainly used for roofing and the remains of quarry buildings and machinery strong points can be seen from both sea level and the South West Coast Path. Tintagel's youth hostel building formerly housed the office, powerhouse and smithy for Lambshouse quarry. A 19th century engine house still stands above the Prince of Wales quarry and Bowithick quarry is now a waste disposal facility. The only slate quarries in Tintagel that remain operational are Trevillet and Trebarwith Road Rustic Quarry.

== Geography and nature ==
=== Coastline ===
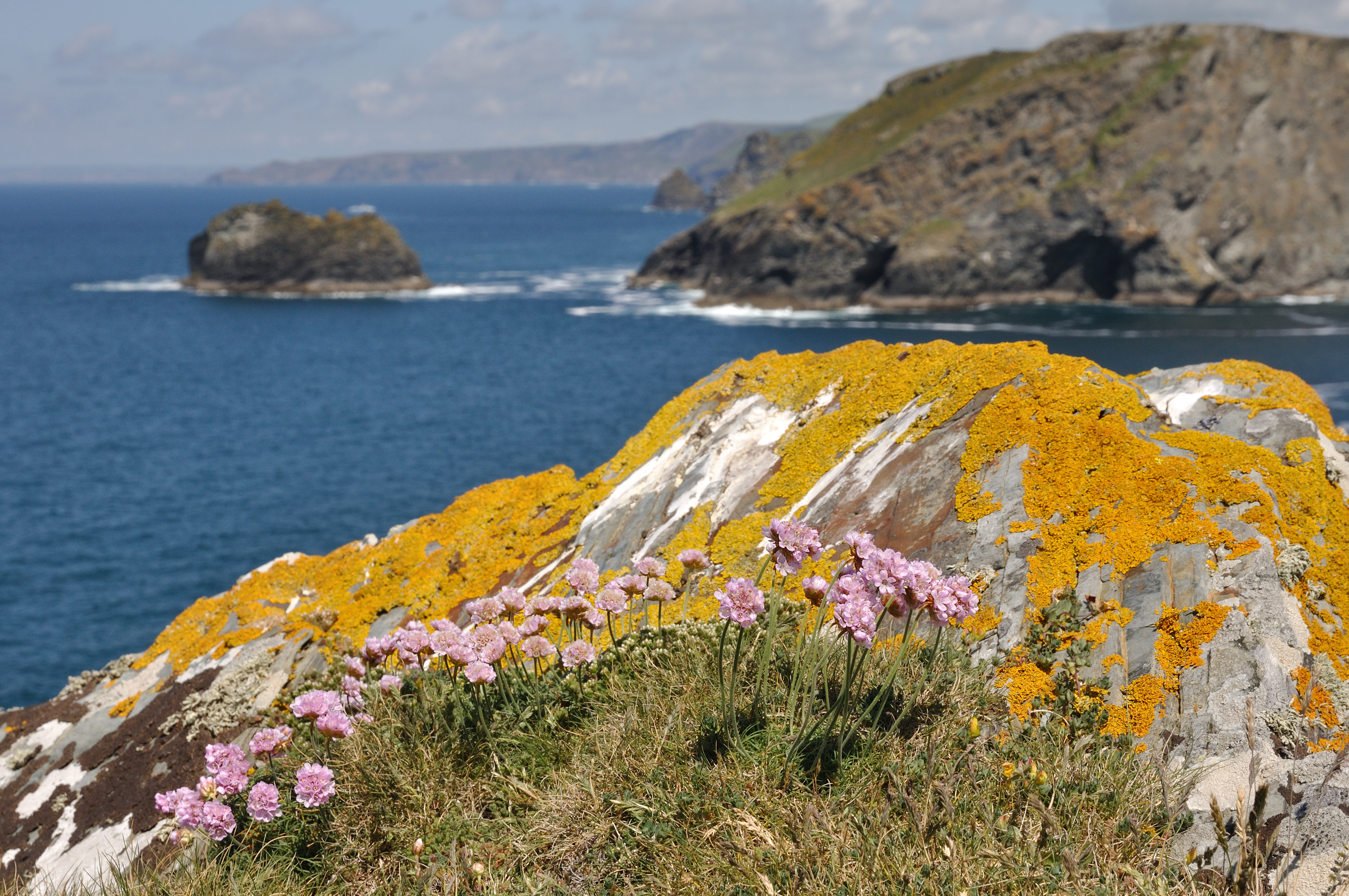
Lichen at the coast at Tintagel

The coastline around Tintagel is significant because it is composed of old Devonian slate; about a mile southwards from Tintagel towards Treknow the coastline was quarried extensively for this hard-wearing roofing surface. Quarries inland at Trebarwith and Trevillet continued to be worked until the mid-20th century. Apart from the island headlands on the coast include Willapark and Start Point.

The turquoise green water around this coast is caused by the slate/sand around Tintagel which contains elements of copper: strong sunlight turns the water a light turquoise green colour in warm weather. The rocks contain various metal ores in small amounts: a few of these were mined in the Victorian period.

Though very near the coast the hill of Condolden (or Kingsdown) is among the very few areas in Cornwall outside Bodmin Moor which exceeds 1000 feet. At Trethevy is the waterfall known as St Nectan's Kieve in a wooded valley. The beach at Bossiney Haven is close by and Trebarwith Strand, just half an hour's walk south of Tintagel, is one of Cornwall's finer beaches, boasting clear seas, golden sands, and superb surf. There is also a small beach at Tintagel Haven immediately north of the castle, as well as a cave known as Merlin's Cave under the castle. A stream called the Trerammett River flows from Treven to Tintagel Haven.

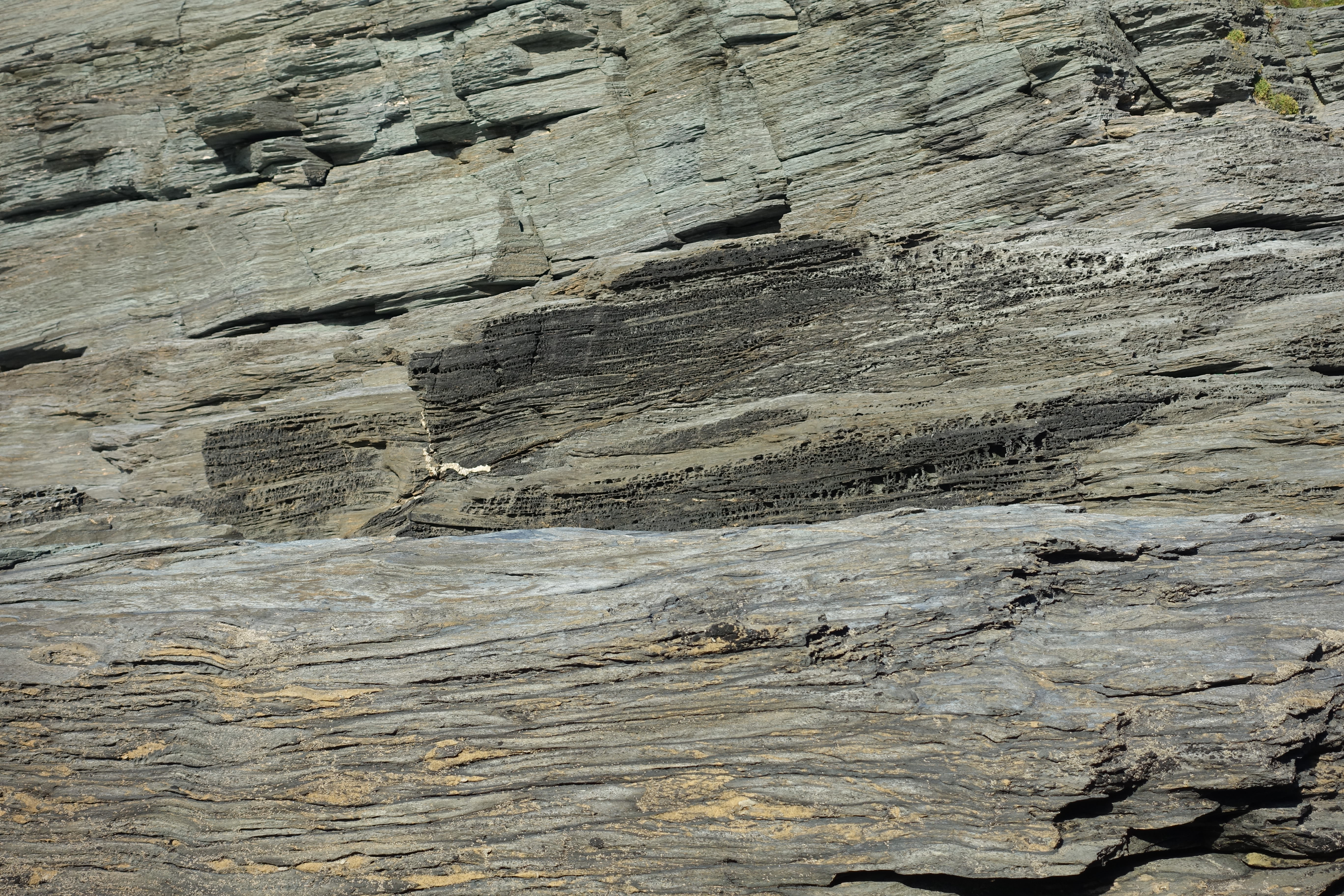
Slate at Trebarwith Strand

The cliffs from Backways Cove, south of Trebarwith Strand to Willapark just to the south of Boscastle are part of the Tintagel Cliffs SSSI (a Site of Special Scientific Interest), designated for both its maritime heaths and geological features. There are also four Geological Conservation Review sites.

Tintagel lies within the Cornwall Area of Outstanding Natural Beauty (AONB). National Trust properties include, besides the Old Post Office in Trevena (see above), fine stretches of the cliffs along the coast including Glebe Cliff, Barras Nose and Penhallick Point. The coastal footpaths include part of the South West Coast Path.

=== Birds ===
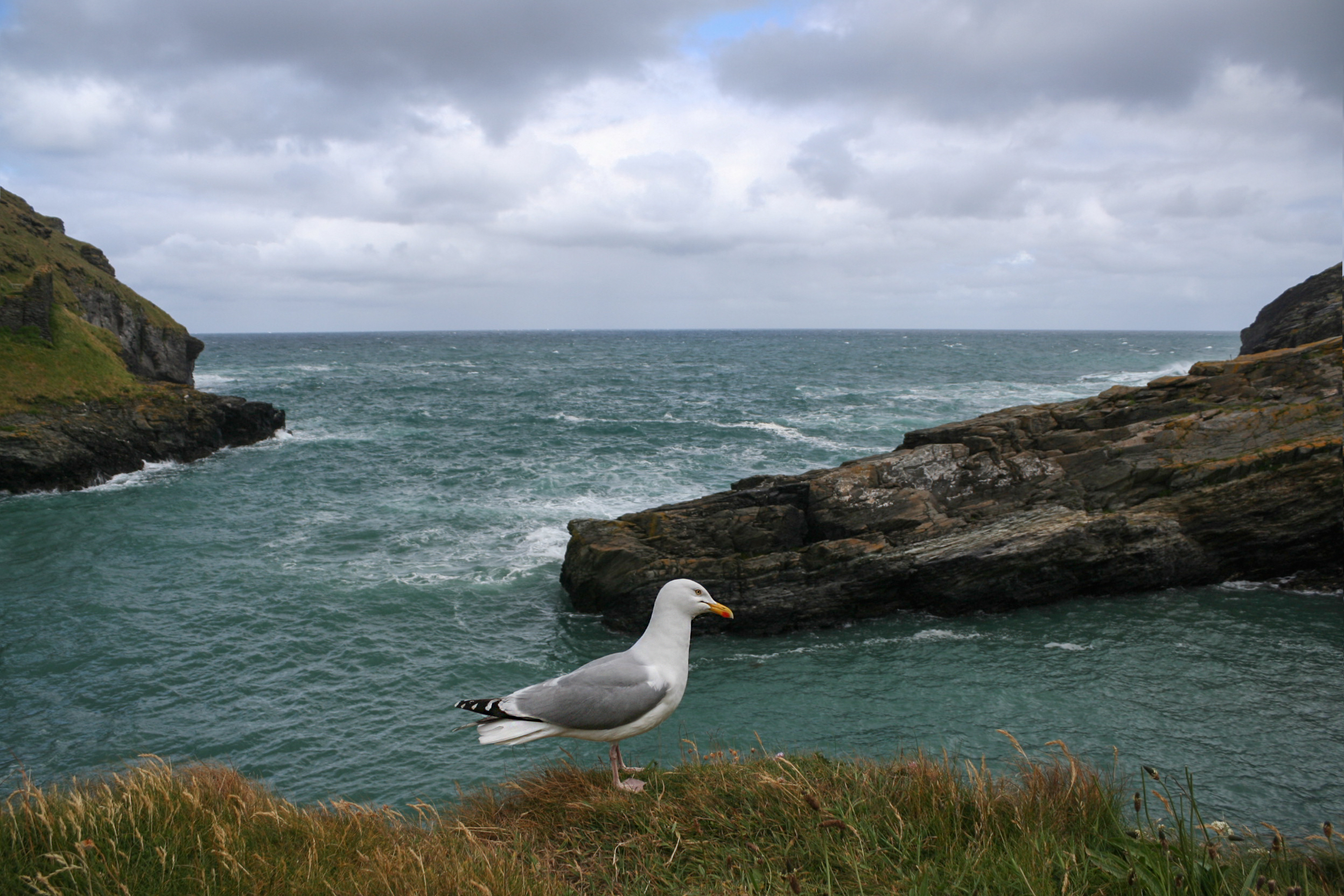
Seabird on the coast

The birds of the coast are well worth observing: in 1935 an anonymous writer mentions Willapark as the scene of spectacular flocks of seabirds (eight species); inland he describes the crows (including the Cornish chough and the raven) and falcons which frequent the district. B. H. Ryves mentions the razorbill as numerous at Tintagel (perhaps the largest colony in the county) and summarises reports from earlier in the century. In 1991, a local bird keeper, Jon Hadwick, published Owl Light about his experiences keeping ten owls and a buzzard. In the early days of the Royal Society for the Protection of Birds Charles Hambly (also known for saving shipwrecked sailors) was a correspondent for the Society. A hundred years later Harry Sandercock observed that even modern agricultural changes had not reduced the bird populations.

=== Plants of the environs of Tintagel ===
"Within easy reach of Tintagel at least 385 varieties of flowers, 30 kinds of grasses, and 16 of ferns can be found ... a 'happy hunting ground' for botanists" and a list of thirty-nine of the rarest is given. (Contribution by E.M.S. to W. J. C. Armstrong's Rambler's Guide, 1935.)

== Social and cultural life ==
Tintagel was the venue for the Gorsedh Kernow in 1964.

=== Social and sporting activities and associations ===
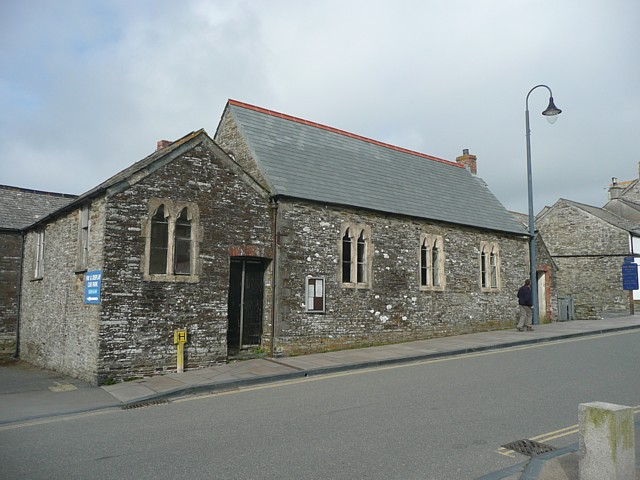
The Old School in Trevena in 2009

The Social Hall established by Mrs Ruth Homan and the Old School in Fore Street have been the chief meeting places during most of the 20th century. Both the Women's Institute and the football and cricket teams are well-supported. Tintagel A.F.C. were champions of Cornwall in 1955–56 and have been in existence over a hundred years; goalkeeper Harry Cann also played for Plymouth Argyle F.C. Until the 1930s there were two golf courses and a few tennis courts: neither golf course reopened in the postwar period. Camelford Rugby Football Club was formed in 2008 and plays its home matches at Parc Tremain, Tintagel. Cornish wrestling tournaments, for prizes, have been held in Tintagel.

The Tintagel Orpheus Male Voice Choir was founded in 1926 by Jack Thomas, a Welshman who worked at Trevillet Quarry. The choir has rehearsed weekly, and performed frequently, ever since.

=== Literary associations ===
Tintagel is used as a locus for the Arthurian mythos by the poet Alfred, Lord Tennyson in the poem Idylls of the King and Algernon Charles Swinburne's Tristram of Lyonesse, a literary version of the Tristan and Iseult legend. Thomas Hardy's The Famous Tragedy of the Queen of Cornwall at Tintagel in Lyonnesse, a one-act play which was published in 1923, is another version of the same legend with events set at Tintagel (the book includes an imaginary drawing of Tintagel Castle at the period). Hardy and his first wife visited Tintagel on various occasions: she drew a sketch of the inside of the church as it was about 1867. It is very prominent in the books in Fay Sampson's Daughter of Tintagel series of Arthurian novels (later retitled Morgan le Fay).

The novelist Dinah Craik visited Tintagel in 1883 and published an informative account of her journey through Cornwall the following year. William Howitt's visit was quite different: his account is called "A day-dream at Tintagel" (in Visits to Remarkable Places). Relatively few works of fiction have Tintagel as a setting: these include Anthony Trollope's short story Malachi's Cove and the Charles and Alice Muriel Williamson's epistolary novel Set in Silver published in 1909. Ernest George Henham was a novelist resident in Devon who used the pseudonym John Trevena for many of his books; it is probable that the surname he chose was derived from the original name for Tintagel, though his writings are concerned mainly with Devon. Tintagel features prominently in Edith Wharton's final, unfinished novel, The Buccaneers, the protagonist of which, Nan St. George, meets her future husband, the Duke of Tintagel, while exploring the ruins of Tintagel Castle. Wharton styled the characters as Duke and Duchess of Tintagel, while Tintagel actually lies within the Duchy of Cornwall; in the novel, the Duke and Duchess live in a newer, fictional Tintagel Castle, built in approximately the late 18th century.

=== Musical and film associations ===
Arnold Bax was inspired to compose his symphonic poem Tintagel after a visit to the village. Edward Elgar also composed while on a visit to Tintagel.

The film Knights of the Round Table had some sequences filmed near Tintagel Castle with local people as extras: this was in 1953 though it was not released until 1954. Some other filming has been carried out in Tintagel, e.g. Malachi's Cove at Trebarwith. The exterior of the Camelot Castle Hotel was used to portray Dr. Seward's asylum in the 1979 film Dracula. The Youth Hostel doubled for the coastguard station in the 1981 BBC serial The Nightmare Man.

== Notable people ==
The Earls and Dukes of Cornwall (to whom the castle belonged) were never resident at Tintagel though a few of them are known to have visited. From 1552 to 1832, Tintagel was a parliamentary borough (generally known as the Borough of Bossiney) sending two members to the House of Commons; these included Sir Francis Walsingham (c. 1532 – 1590), Sir Francis Drake (c. 1540 – 1596), Francis Bacon (1561–1626), Sir Simon Harcourt, 1st Viscount Harcourt (1661–1727) and James Stuart-Wortley, 1st Baron Wharncliffe (1776–1845).

During the same period, there were also mayors of the borough of whom the best known is William Wade (fl. 1756–1786). Contemporaries of Mayor Wade were the Rev. Arthur Wade (vicar 1770–1810) and Charles Chilcott (d. 1815) who was known for his gigantic stature. The Rev. R. B. Kinsman (vicar 1851–1894) was also honorary constable of the castle.

During the 19th century, Tintagel was visited by many writers, including poet Robert Stephen Hawker (1803–1875), Charles Dickens (1812–1870), Alfred, Lord Tennyson (1809–1892), Thomas Hardy (1840–1928), and the mystic philosopher Rudolf Steiner (1861–1925). It was also the occasional residence of John Douglas Cook (1808?–1868), founder editor of the Saturday Review who is buried at Tintagel. He bought Trevena House as an occasional residence: it later became the front part of King Arthur's Hall (see § Archaeology and architecture).

Harry Cann (1905–1980), a football goalkeeper who played 225 games for Plymouth Argyle, was local. Henry George White, the village schoolmaster for many years, was also a prolific amateur painter. The Very Rev. Cliff Piper (born 1953), Dean of Moray, Ross and Caithness was born at Tintagel.
