= Condolden =

Hill in Cornwall, England

Coordinates: 50.652189°N 4.703306°W

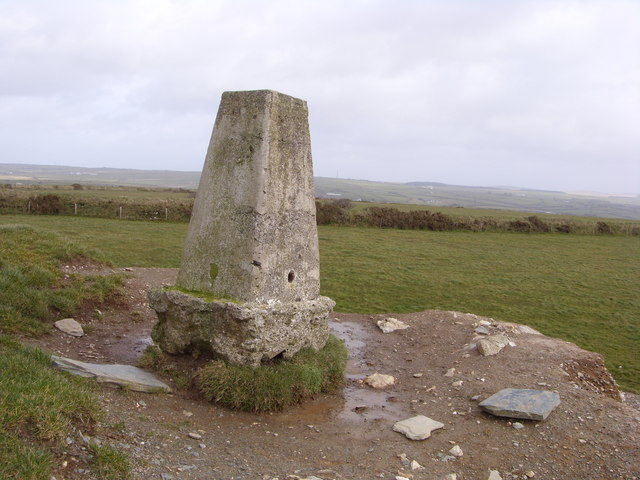
The Ordnance Survey triangulation point on Condolden

Condolden (Cornish: Goondollven) is a hill in north Cornwall, England, UK. The summit is 308 metres (1,010 ft) above ordnance datum.

Condolden is two miles (3 km) southeast of Tintagel village and is on the eastern border of Tintagel civil parish between Waterpit Down (to the east) and Penpethy (to the west). It is the highest point in the parish.

The largest of the Bronze Age barrows in Tintagel is at Condolden (another is at Menadue). On the edges of the hill are (from the north) Halgabron, Trenale, Downrow, Truas, Menadue and Trewarmett. Near Trenale was the Iron Age fort of Trenale Bury which was ploughed up during the Second World War. The barrow has not been excavated and is topped by an Ordnance Survey triangulation point (or "trig"). The land is used for arable farming.
