= Trevillet =

Hamlet in Cornwall, England

Coordinates: 50°39′43″N 4°43′05″W

Trevillett or Trevillet, the former ending with “tt” being in all historic documents held by properties in the hamlet, is a hamlet in Cornwall, England, United Kingdom. It is located within the civil parish of Tintagel, to the east of Bossiney village.

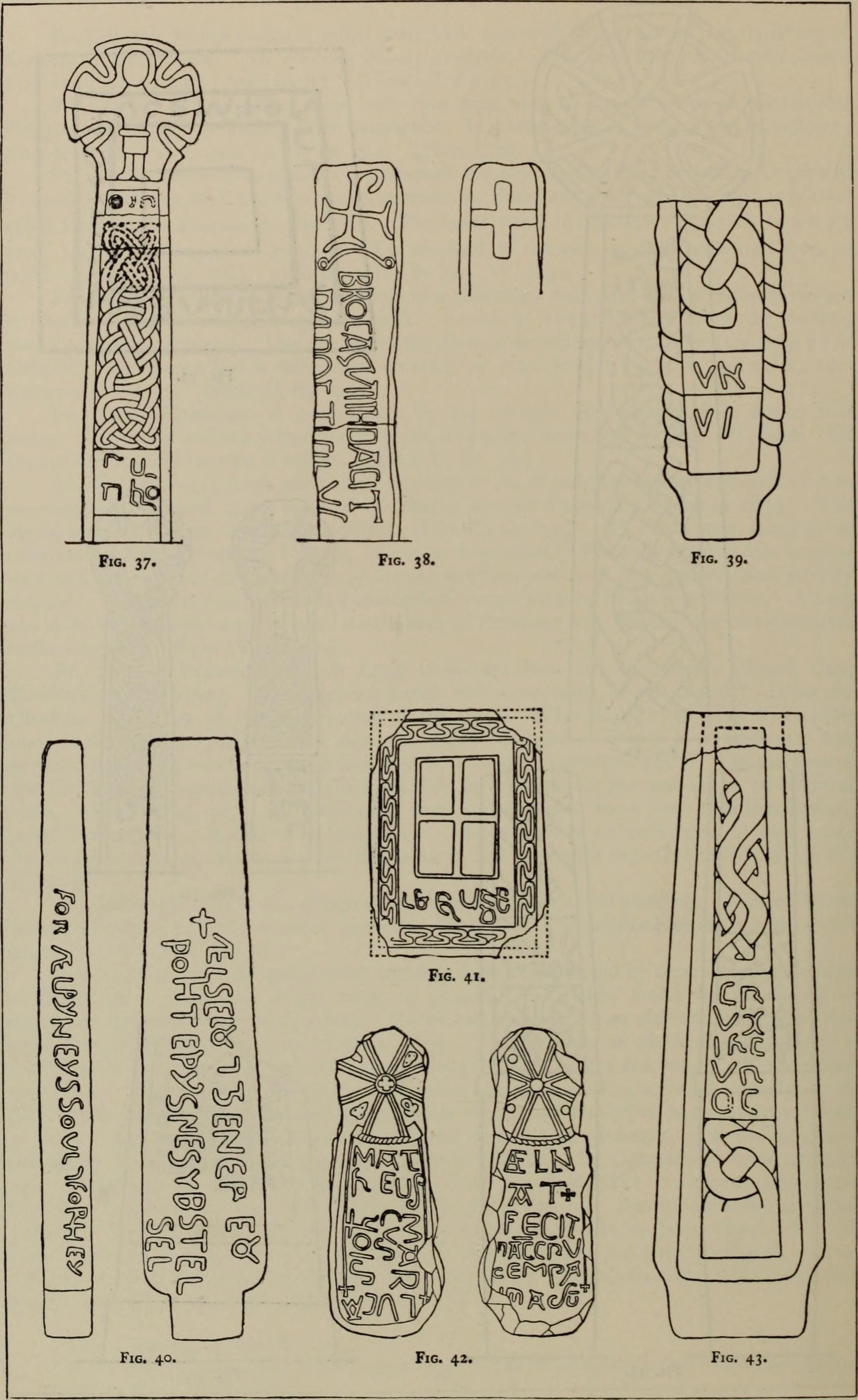
Some Cornish crosses (Aelnat's cross is fig. 42)

Trevillett was the site of a mansion built in the 16th century by Thomas Wood of Lew Trenchard in Devon. His son John became member of Parliament for the borough of Bossiney in the parliaments of 1614 and 1621–22 and died in 1623. The Trevillett slate quarry is nearby. In Rocky Valley (the valley of the Trevillett River) are two mills; Trevillett Mill was originally in the Trevillett hamlet, the water wheel of the mill was removed and placed on a private residence in Rocky Valley now called Trevillett Mill and was made famous by an 1851 painting by Thomas Creswick.

Aelnat's cross, which was found at Trevillett and then moved to Trevena, is finely carved. The inscription can be read as Aelnat fecit hanc crucem pro anima sua (Ælnat made this cross for [the good of] his soul) (the back of the stone has the names of the four evangelists): the name of this man is Saxon (together with Alfwy mentioned in 1086 he is the only Anglo-Saxon recorded in connection with the area). Since the first report of it described it being in use as a gatepost its original location is unknown; that location could have been associated with St Piran's Chapel, Trethevy.

Trevillett Quarry was the largest slate quarry in Tintagel and at its height of activity employed 200 men. Although still open, it now employs considerably fewer. The saw house where the slate was cut up became the Maybridge Chemical Works which relocated to Loughborough in 2011 with the loss of 60 local jobs.
