= Saint Materiana =

Welsh saint

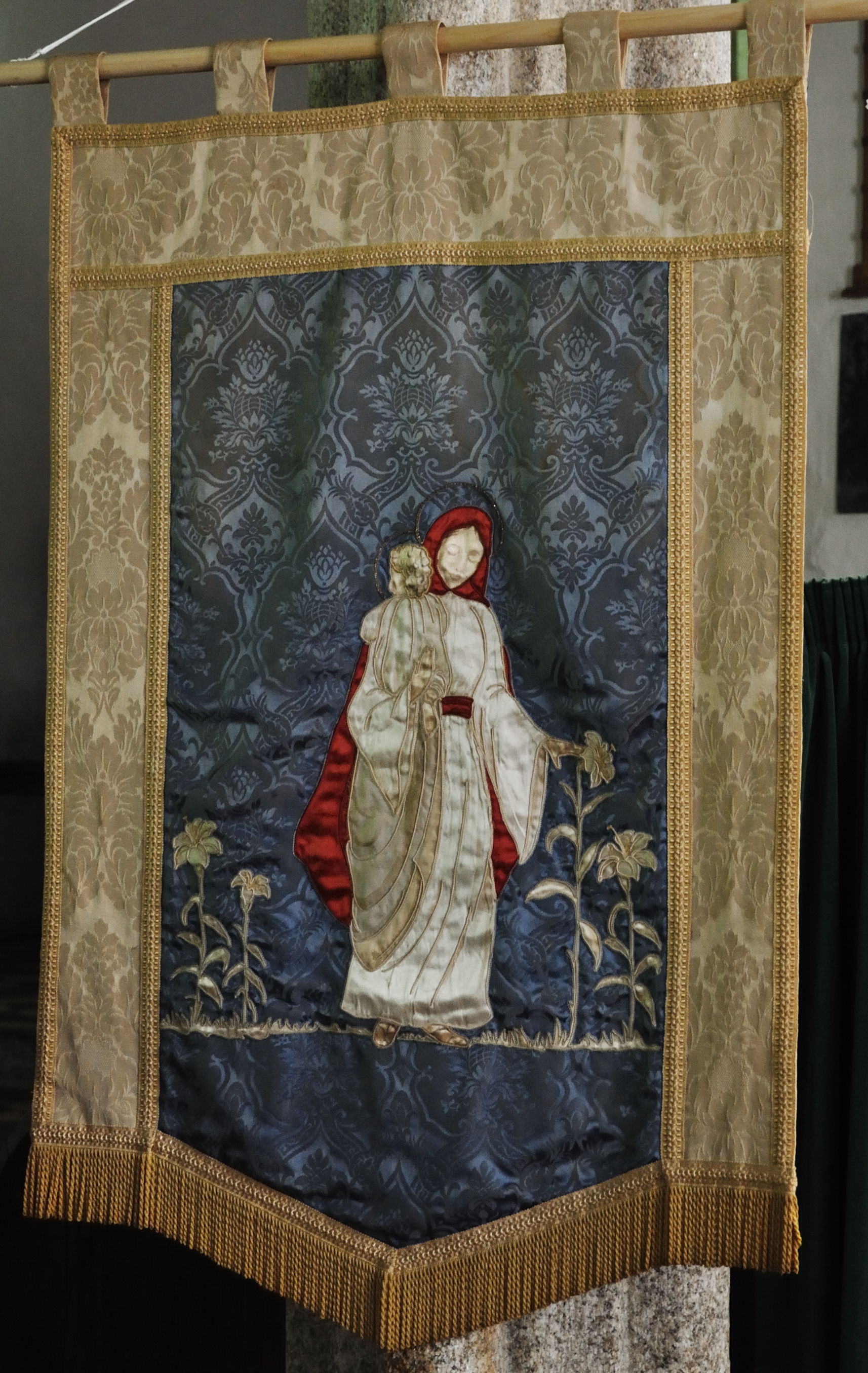
- Banner of St Materiana in Minster Church
- Born: c. 440; Gwent, Wales
- Died: early 6th century (?); Minster, Cornwall
- Venerated in: Anglican Communion; Catholic Church; Eastern Orthodox Church
- Major shrine: Minster, Cornwall
- Feast: 9 April
- Attributes: crown; widow's robe
- Patronage: Minster, Cornwall; Tintagel, Cornwall; Trawsfynydd, Wales

Saint Materiana (also spelled Madrun, Madryn, Merteriana, Merthiana, and other variations) is a Welsh saint, patron of two churches in Cornwall and one in Wales.

== Life ==
The name Materiana was corrupted to "Marcelliana" in medieval times. Another spelling of her name sometimes used is "Mertheriana" or "Merthiana", resembling the Welsh merthyr - "martyr". Matrona was a widespread Roman name, and there is no evidence of any purported connection with a pre-Christian goddess named Modron. Materiana is said to have been a princess of the 5th century, the eldest of three daughters of King Vortimer the Blessed, who, after her father's death, ruled over Gwent with her husband Prince Ynyr. According to tradition she and her eldest son Ceidio were forced to flee from her grandfather's wooden castle when it was surrounded and set on fire. The two of them reached the hill of Carn Fadryn where they sheltered. Later Ceidio founded a church below the hill at Ceidio to which the Lord of Madryn has the right of presentation.

=== Minster church ===
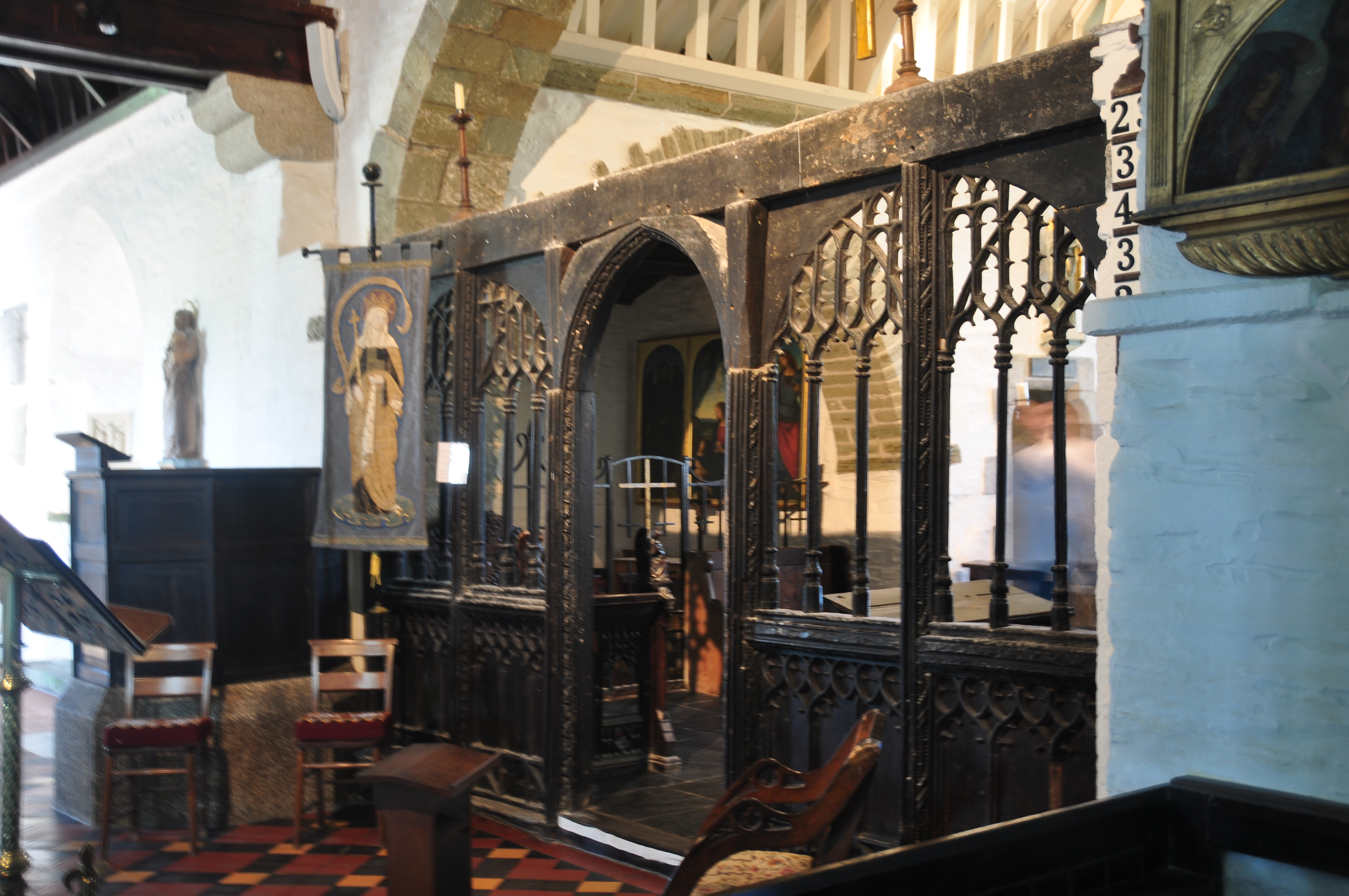
The rood screen of St Materiana's Church, Tintagel (on the left is the banner portraying St Materiana, designed by Sir Ninian Comper)

Materiana's primary patronal church is the parish church of Minster, dedicated under the name "Merteriana." The churches were established some time earlier than the settlement at Boscastle (in Norman times when a castle was built there). Until the Reformation, St Materiana's tomb was preserved in the church. Traditions of the saint were recorded by William Worcester in 1478: he states that her tomb was venerated at Minster and that her feast day was 9 April.

=== Tintagel church ===
The first church at Tintagel was probably in the 6th century, founded as a daughter church of Minster. By 1258, Materiana was recorded as Tintagel’s patroness.

The current St Materiana's Church was restored by architect James Piers St Aubyn in 1870. The north doorway dates to around 1080. There are two memorials which portray St Materiana: a statue in the chancel and a stained glass window in the nave. The Cornish historian Charles Thomas proposed that the Norman church of Tintagel and its dedication to St Materiana were due to the patronage of William de Bottreaux, lord of Boscastle rather than the Earl of Cornwall.

The parish feast traditionally celebrated at Tintagel was 19 October, the feast day of St Denys, patron of the chapel at Trevena.

=== Trawsfynydd church ===
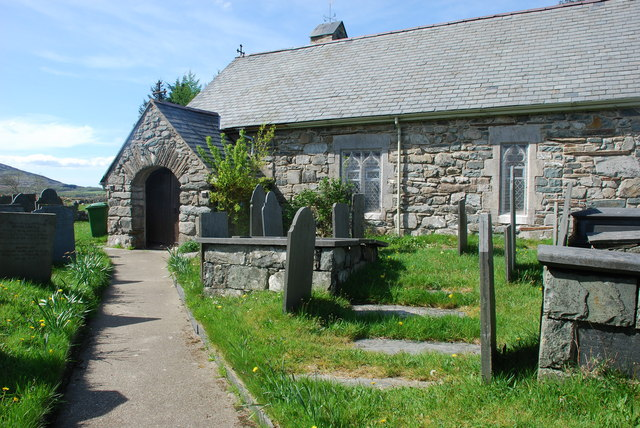
St Madryn's Church, Trawsfynydd

The parish church at Trawsfynydd is dedicated to a St Madryn, Princess of Gwent, who is usually identified with Materiana. Browne Willis recorded that her feast there was June 9. A marble statue of St Madryn was formerly at Madryn, Pwllheli.

== See also ==
- Puerto Madryn—a town in Argentina named after Madryn, Nefyn, Wales
- Carn Fadrun—a hill in North Wales named after the saint
- Nefyn—a town in North Wales (the Madryn estate is nearby)
