= John Douglas Cook =

Scottish journalist (died 1868)

John Douglas Cook (1808?–1868) was a Scottish journalist, known as the founding editor of the Saturday Review.

== Life ==
He was born at Banchory-Ternan in Aberdeenshire, probably in 1808. At an early age he obtained an appointment in India, quarrelled with his employers there, and found himself destitute in London. He came to know John Walter, the proprietor of The Times and John Murray of the Quarterly Review; and through Murray Philip Stanhope.

When John Walter was elected for Nottingham as a Tory in 1841, Cook accompanied him to help in the election. There he met Lord Lincoln, who became part of Robert Peel's administration. Lincoln found Cook a post on a commission into the Duchy of Cornwall; it came to an end about 1848. Some of the Peelite faction, to which Lincoln belonged, had bought the Morning Chronicle to be their organ, and Cook was appointed to the editorship.

In 1854 Cook ceased to be editor of the Morning Chronicle on its sale to other proprietors. Contributors to the Chronicle then supported him in the Saturday Review, started in November 1855 on a new plan; and it was soon successful. Cook recognised talent and handled it well.

In his later years Cook had a house at Tintagel in Cornwall, but was seldom absent from London. He continued to edit the Saturday Review till his death, 10 August 1868. He was buried in Tintagel churchyard and a stained glass window in the parish church was added to commemorate him.
