= Knightsmill, Cornwall =

Hamlet in Cornwall, England

Coordinates: 50.593°N 4.727°W

Knightsmill
- Location within Cornwall
- OS grid reference: SX071806
- Unitary authority: Cornwall
- Ceremonial county: Cornwall
- Region: South West
- Country: England
- Sovereign state: United Kingdom
- Post town: Tintagel
- Postcode district: PL34 0

Knightsmill is a hamlet in Cornwall, England. It is half a mile east of St Teath. It is in the civil parish of Tintagel
