= Tintagel Old Post Office =

Historic post office in Cornwall, England

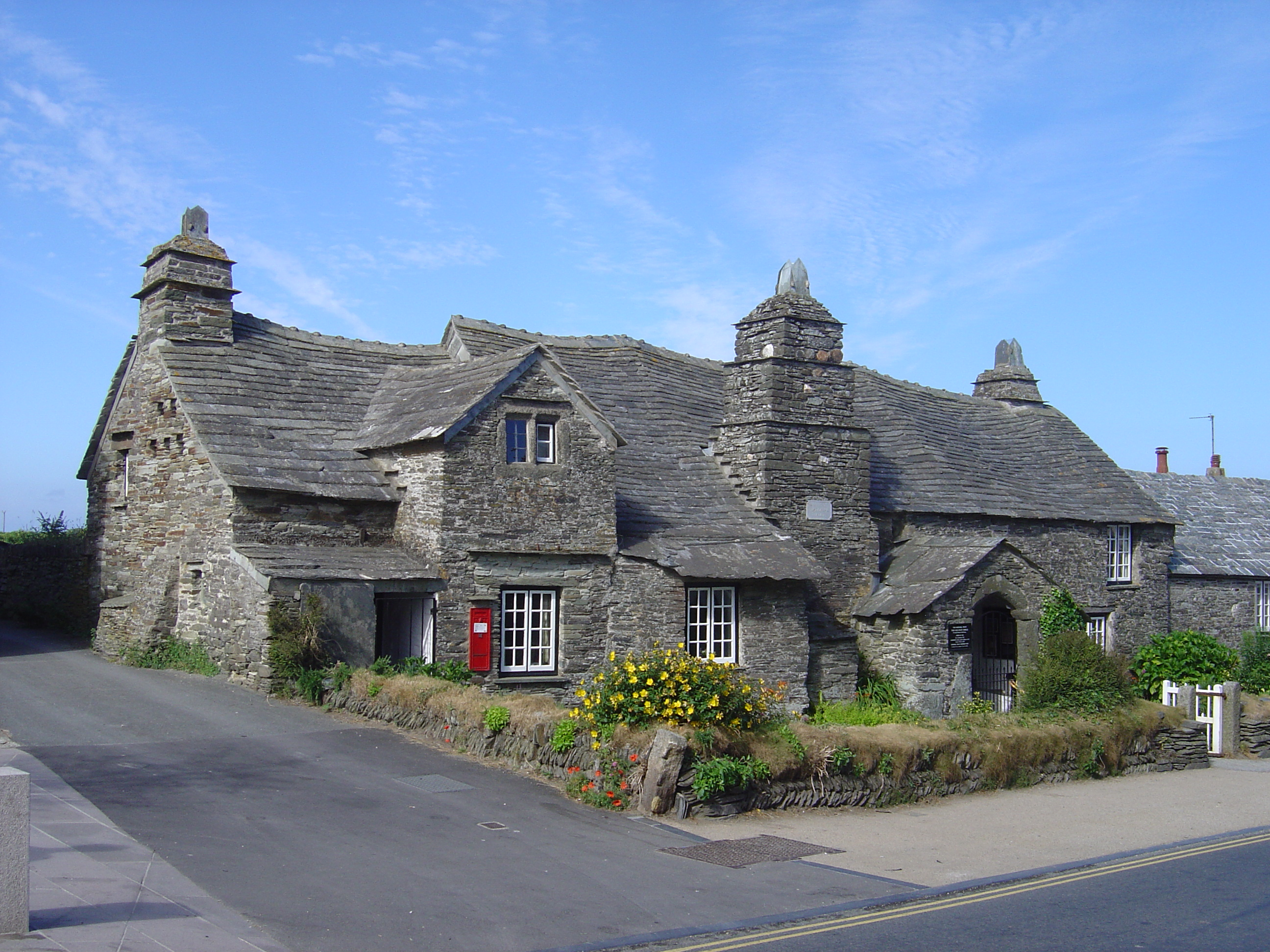
- The Old Post Office from the east

- Location within Cornwall

General information
- Architectural style: Traditional Cornish longhouse
- Location: Fore Street, Tintagel, England
- Coordinates: 50°39′48″N 4°45′06″W
- Opened: 14th century
- Owner: National Trust

Technical details
- Material: Stone and slate roof

Listed Building – Grade I
- Designated: 19 January 1952
- Reference no.: 1143438

Tintagel Old Post Office is a 14th-century stone house, built to the plan of a medieval manor house, situated in Tintagel, Cornwall, England. The house, and its surrounding cottage garden, are in the ownership of the National Trust, and the building is Grade I listed.

The name dates from the Victorian period when it briefly held a licence to be the letter receiving station for the district. The Trust has restored it to this condition. It was among the early acquisitions of the Trust (1903) and closes in the winter months.

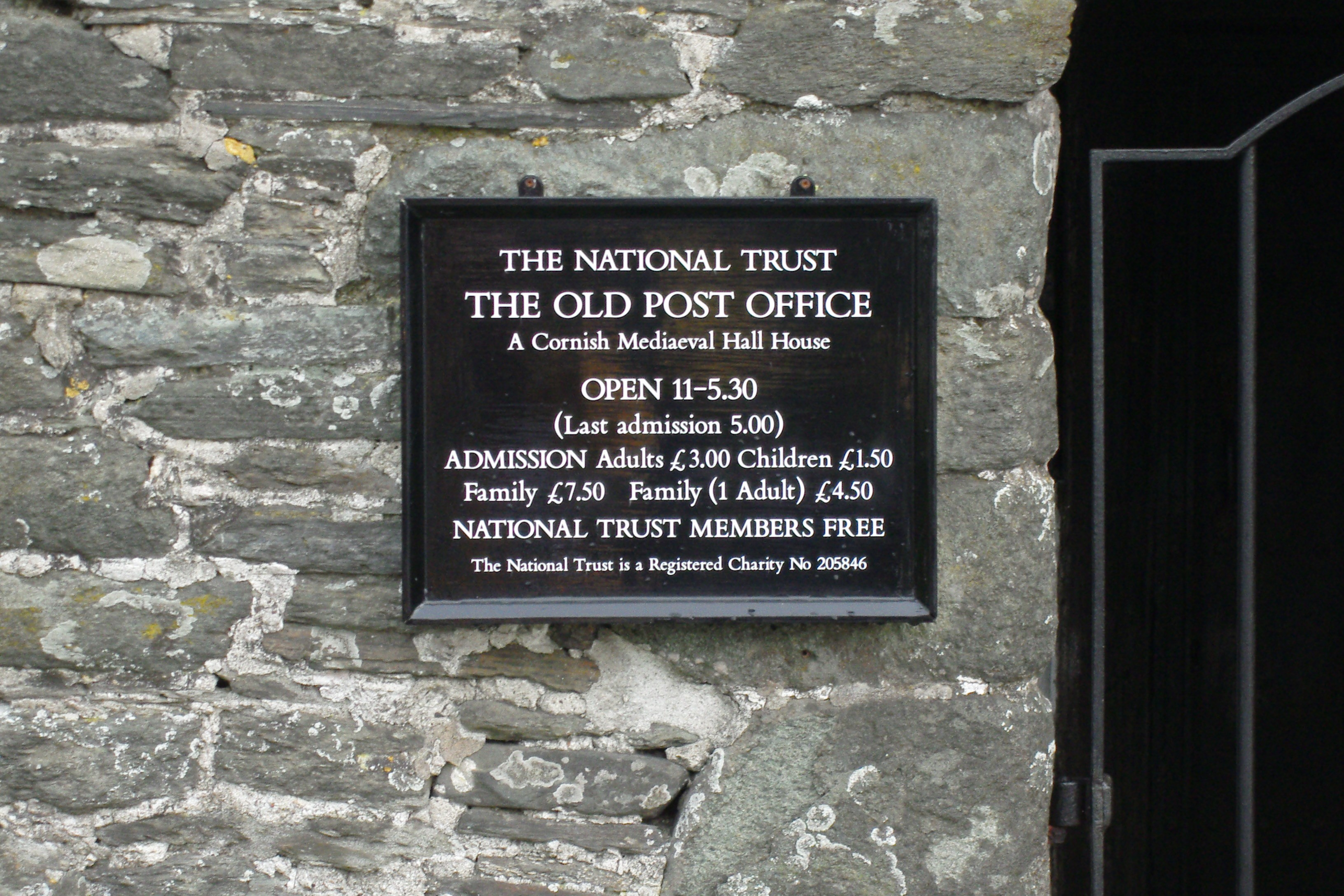
The National Trust sign

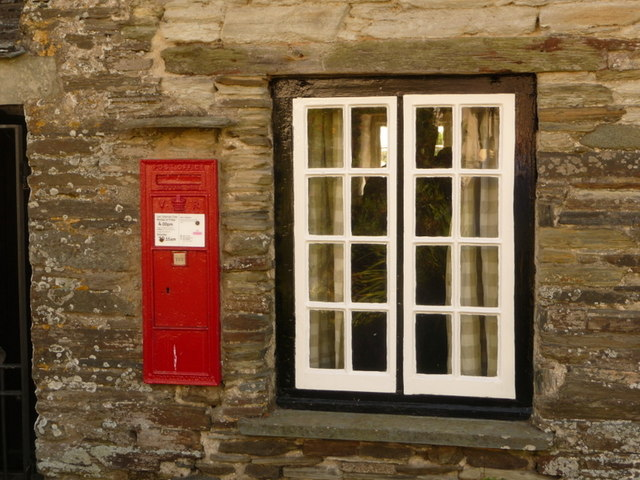
The post box

The building was acquired by the Trust from its owner Catherine Eliza Johns (died 1925) who had employed the architect Detmar Blow to renovate it in 1896. (Blow was also responsible for some buildings at Treknow in the 1890s.) Catherine Johns had bought it in 1895 to prevent its demolition. She and a number of other artists then raised money to enable the National Trust to buy it from her.
