= Treven =

English hamlet

Coordinates: 50°39′25″N 4°45′0″W

Treven is a hamlet between Trevena and Tregatta in the parish of Tintagel, Cornwall, England, United Kingdom. Tintagel Primary School is at Treven.

== Notable people ==
- Sheila Oates Williams, mathematician
