= Trenale =

Hamlet in Cornwall, England

Coordinates: 50.6593°N 4.7326°W

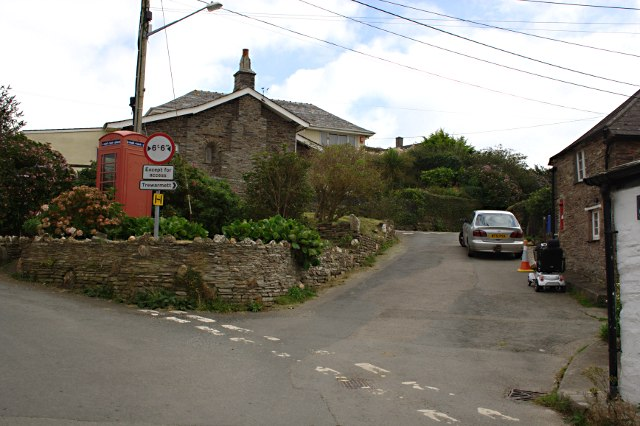
Trenale

Trenale is a hamlet in north Cornwall, England, United Kingdom. It is located within the civil parish of Tintagel, to the south-east of Tintagel village.

Near Trenale was the Iron Age fort of Trenale Bury which was ploughed up during the Second World War. The first Methodist meeting house in the parish of Tintagel was established at Trenale in 1807.
