= Treknow =

Coordinates: 50.6492°N 4.7515°W

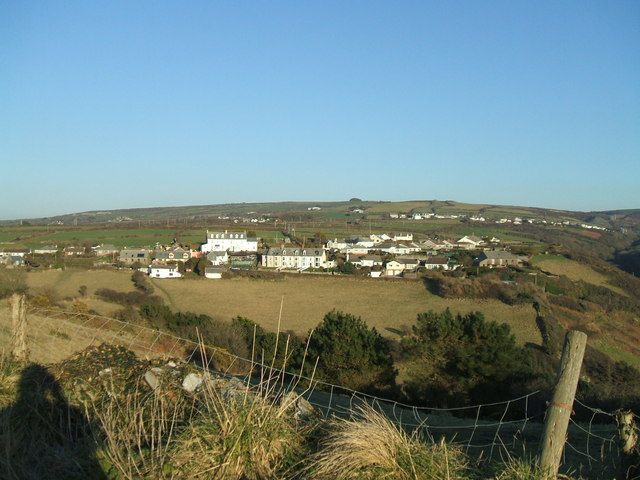

- Location within Cornwall
- OS grid reference: SX056869
- Civil parish: Tintagel
- Unitary authority: Cornwall
- Ceremonial county: Cornwall
- Region: South West
- Country: England
- Sovereign state: United Kingdom
- Post town: TINTAGEL
- Postcode district: PL34
- Dialling code: 01840
- Police: Devon and Cornwall
- Fire: Cornwall
- Ambulance: South Western
- UK Parliament: North Cornwall

Treknow (/trəˈnoʊ/) is a small village in Tintagel civil parish, Cornwall, England, United Kingdom: it is the second largest settlement, and is located between Trevena and Trebarwith. It is situated 19 miles (31 km) north of Bodmin, 4 miles (6.4 km) north-west of Camelford, and 1 mile (1.6 km) west of Tintagel, grid reference SX056869

Treknow (pictured right, from the old road to Trebarwith Strand) lies within the Cornwall Area of Outstanding Natural Beauty (AONB).

== History ==
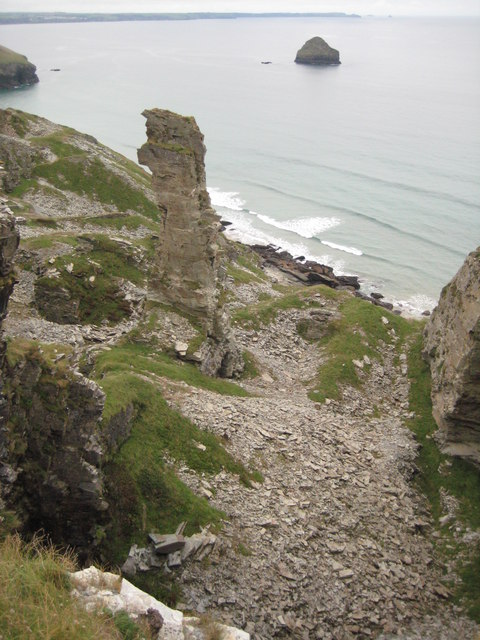
Lanterdan Quarry

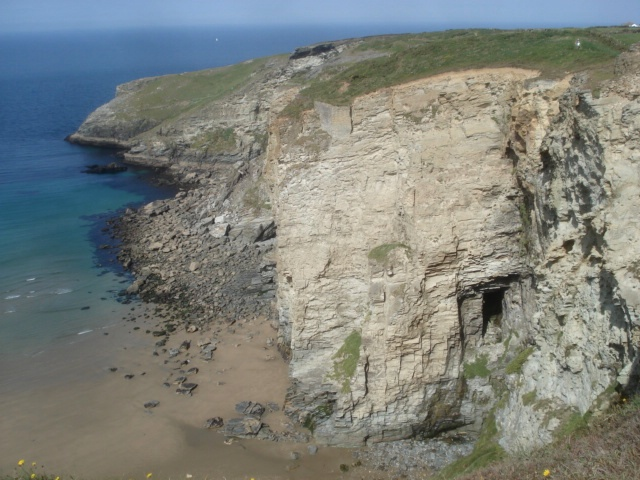
Cliff quarries at Hole Beach

Treknow is mentioned as a manor (under the name of 'Tretdeno') in Domesday Book (1086). Charles Thomas has suggested that this manor was larger than the manor of Bossiney within which were Trevena and Tintagel Castle and its southern boundary was the Trebarwith river. Slate was quarried here from about 1305 to shortly before the Second World War: many of the quarries were on the coast and later others were opened in the Trebarwith valley to the south. One of the oldest is Lanterdan, recorded in 1464: Bagalow Quarry near Hole Beach was an enterprise of Edgar Jeffray (early 19th century). A small copper mine also operated in the latter years of the 18th century. The acidic local soil was manured with beach sand from nearby Trebarwith Strand: the trade in sand led to road improvements in the early 19th century (the Trebarwith Strand to Condolden "Sanding Road").

Some buildings in the village display a marked Arts and Crafts influence, probably as a result of the work of architect Detmar Blow who is known to have worked on the Old Post Office in Tintagel for four years from 1896.

Treknow has a village hall and one small hotel. The former small Chapel of the Holy Family (Church of England, built in 1929) has been redeveloped for private use.

== Sources and bibliography ==
- "Cornwall Industrial Settlements Initiative report 'Treknow and Tregatta', 2004" (PDF). Historic Cornwall.
- Canner, A. C. (1982) The Parish of Tintagel. Camelford: A. C. Canner
- Dyer, Peter (2005) Tintagel: a portrait of a parish. Cambridge: Cambridge Books. ISBN 0-9550097-0-7
