= Trewarmett =

Hamlet in Cornwall, England

Coordinates: 50.6466°N 4.7371°W

Trewarmett: Cornish: Trewerman
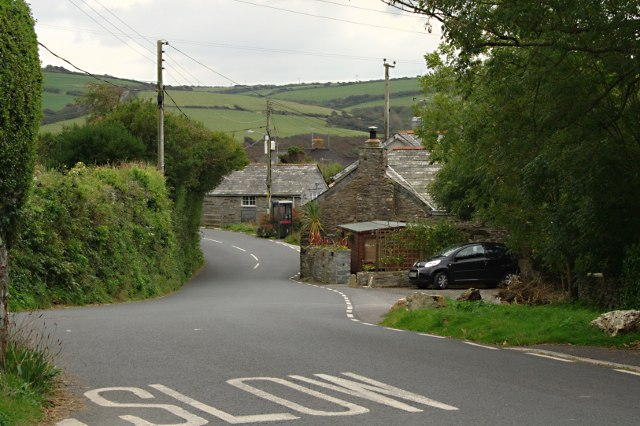

- Location within Cornwall
- OS grid reference: SX066866
- Civil parish: Tintagel
- Unitary authority: Cornwall
- Ceremonial county: Cornwall
- Region: South West
- Country: England
- Sovereign state: United Kingdom
- Post town: TINTAGEL
- Postcode district: PL34
- Dialling code: 01840
- Police: Devon and Cornwall
- Fire: Cornwall
- Ambulance: South Western
- UK Parliament: North Cornwall

Trewarmett (Cornish: Trewerman) is a small hamlet in Cornwall, England, United Kingdom. It lies within the civil parish of Tintagel, 3 miles (5 km) north-west of Camelford. To the west of Trewarmett is Trebarwith Nature Reserve.

Trewarmett lies within the Cornwall Area of Outstanding Natural Beauty (AONB).

There was formerly a Methodist church in Trewarmett; the Methodist cemetery is nearby.

The Trebarwith valley nearby was used for slate mining in the 19th century. The Prince of Wales Engine House was built in 1871 to transport slate and water from the quarries towards Tintagel. The engine house fell into disrepair and was restored by the local Prince of Wales Engine House Society. In 2014, the Prince of Wales declined an offer to sell the property to private buyers.
