= Forrabury and Minster parish churches =

Churches in Cornwall, England

Coordinates: 50.683°N 4.676°W

St Materiana's Church, Minster / St Symphorian's Church, Forrabury
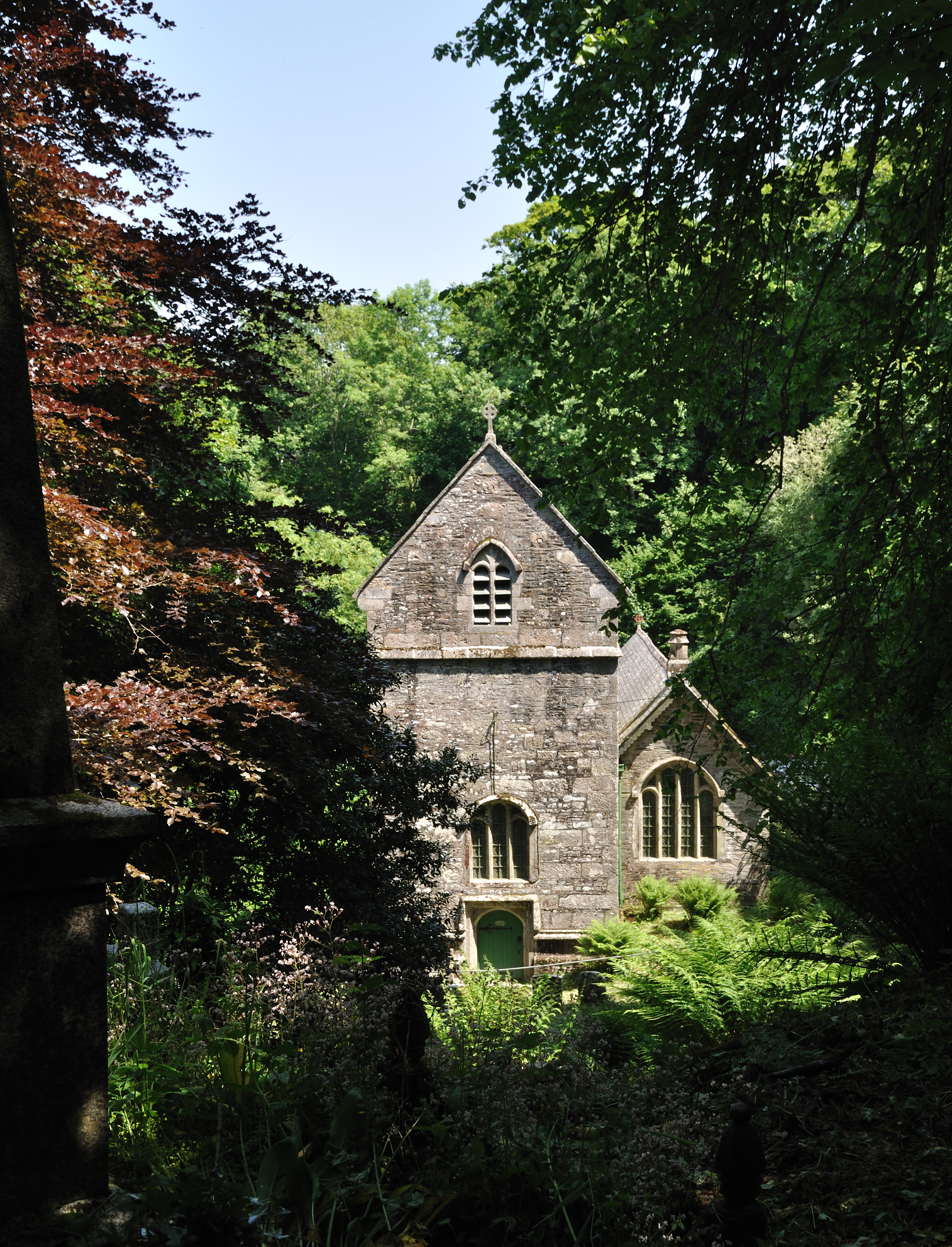
- St Merteriana's Church (Minster)
- St Materiana's Church, Minster / St Symphorian's Church, Forrabury
- Denomination: Church of England
- Churchmanship: Broad Church

History
- Dedication: Saint Materiana / Saint Symphorian

Administration
- Province: Canterbury
- Diocese: Truro
- Archdeaconry: Bodmin
- Deanery: Trigg Minor
- Parish: Forrabury and Minster

Clergy
- Rector: Rector of Boscastle group of churches

Listed Building – Grade I
- Official name: Church of St Materiana
- Designated: 17 December 1962
- Reference no.: 1327752

Listed Building – Grade II*
- Official name: Church of St Symphorian
- Designated: 17 December 1962
- Reference no.: 1143467

The civil parishes to which the Forrabury and Minster parish churches belong were united in 1919 to form Forrabury and Minster parish, within Cornwall, England, UK. The main settlement in the parish is Boscastle. The two rectories had been united in 1800.

The original Forrabury / Minster boundary crossed the river so the harbour end of the village was in Forrabury and the upriver area in Minster. The churches were established some time earlier than the settlement at Boscastle (in Norman times when a castle was built there).

== Minster Church ==
The mother church of Boscastle is dedicated to Materiana of Cornwall and nestles among the trees of Minster Wood in the valley of the River Valency half-a-mile east of Boscastle at grid reference SX 110 904. Minster Church was built in Norman times (some late medieval additions and restoration work carried out in the 19th century): it is listed Grade I.

The Celtic name of Minster was Talkarn but it was renamed Minster in Anglo-Saxon times because of a monastery on the site. Until the Reformation St Materiana's tomb was preserved in the church. (Another spelling of her name sometimes used is 'Mertheriana' but the usual Latin form is Materiana.) For many years the Anglican parishes of Forrabury and Minster have been in the charge of a Rector who is responsible for a group of adjoining parishes as well as these.

Minster Church was damaged by the flood of August 2004 and in the following year archaeological work was done at the church to obtain a clearer idea of the history of the building. When the church was flooded it damaged the pews, the electric organ and a lot of the church.

Minister Church is also designated as a Site of Special Scientific Interest, for its population of greater horseshoe bats, a rare and threatened species in the European and British Red Data Books. The church supports the largest known greater horseshoe bat maternity roost in Cornwall, one of the largest in the UK.

== Forrabury Church ==
Forrabury church also has some Norman work but the tower was added in 1750; it is listed Grade II*.

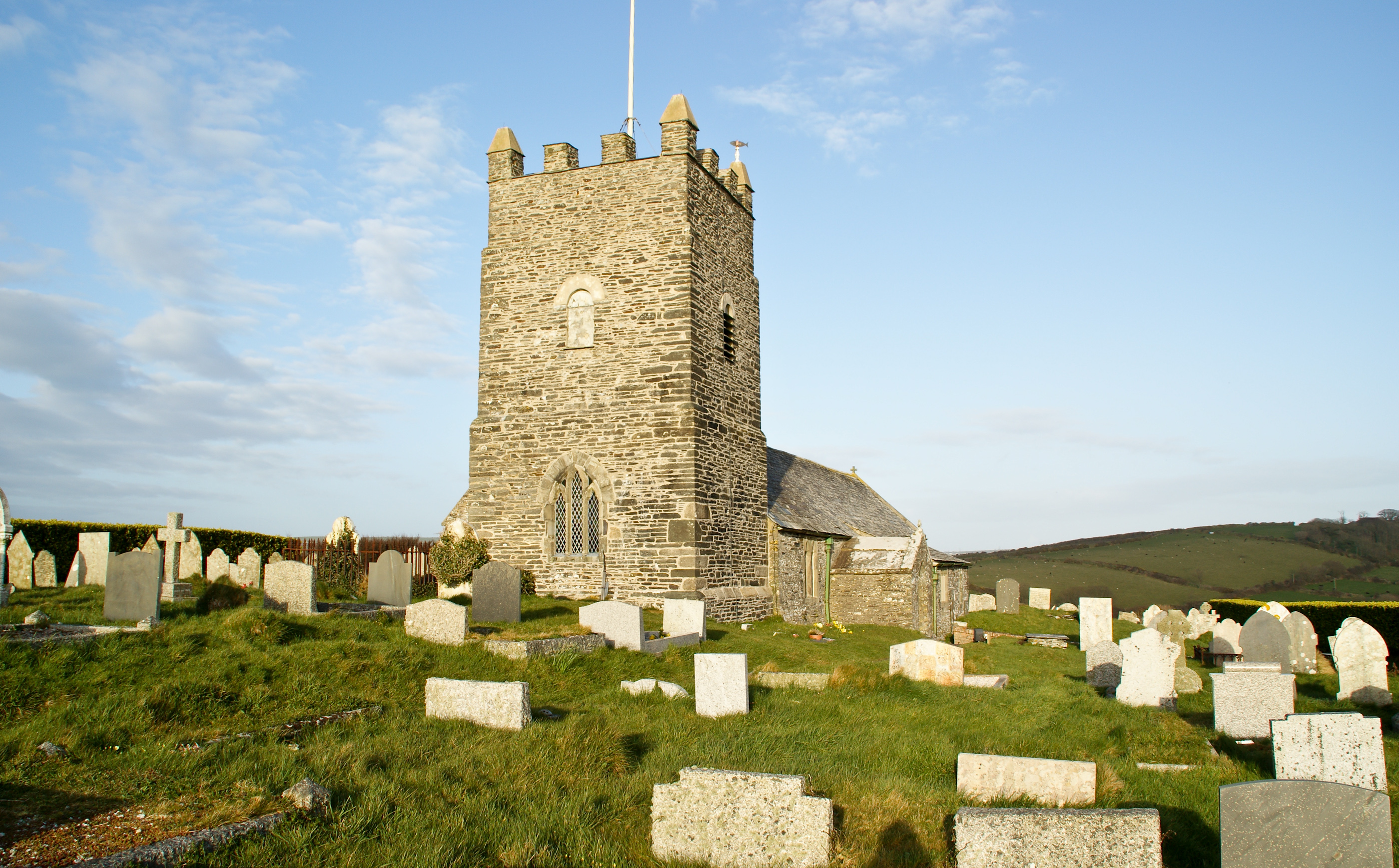
Forrabury Parish Church

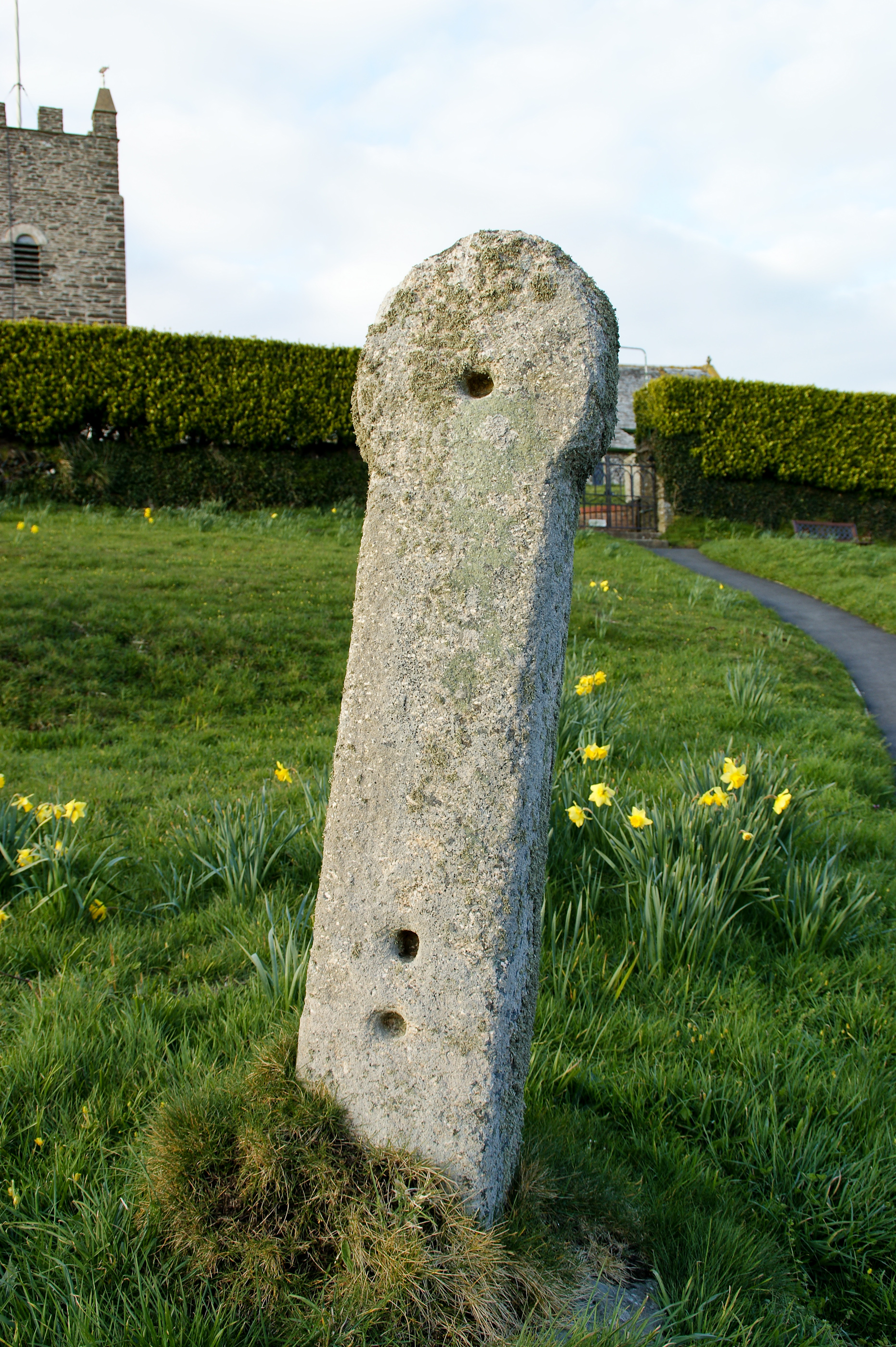
The Cornish cross

The Rev. R. S. Hawker wrote a poem on "The Bells of Forrabury": it was based on a local legend arising from the absence of a peal of bells in the tower. The legend says that bells were being carried over from Spain. They were made in Spain to make the bells at Forrabury the best in the country. The bells were carried over on a boat with a Spanish captain and a local fisherman. When they went past Tintagel on a Sunday they heard the bells of the church ring out. The fisherman went on the floor of the boat and prayed saying thank you for arriving home safely. The Spanish captain pushed him and laughed at the man's religion. The legend says as he did a wave came over and ruined the boat. The boat (and bells) were in pieces. The fisherman got on the rocks safely but not the captain. It is said that the ghost bells of the ship haunt the area today.

The church has a two manual pipe organ. Outside the churchyard stands a Cornish cross which has been moved from its original site, which is likely to have been near the field called Cross Park.

== Waterpit Down ==
At Waterpit Down (in Minster parish on the road towards Launceston) are the remains of a cross probably from the 10th century.
