= Tintagel Slate Quarries =

Series of quarries in Cornwall, England

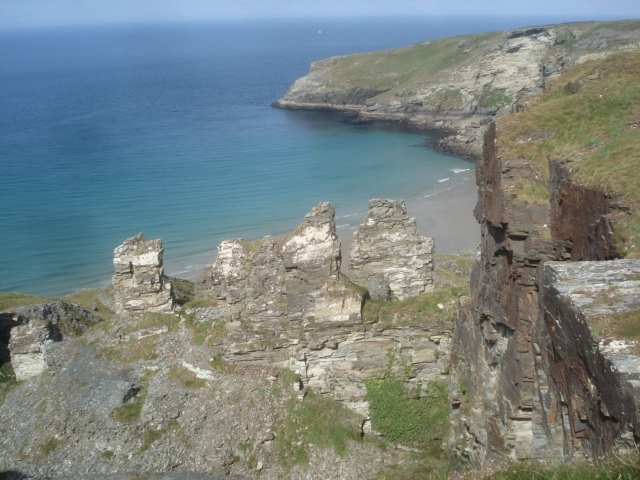
Rock pinnacles in West Quarry

Tintagel Slate Quarries fall into two categories: the series of quarries lying between Tintagel Castle and Trebarwith Strand on the north coast of Cornwall, South West England and the open cast quarries further inland. There are around eight cliff-edge quarries as well as two wharfs, all of which are now disused as well as four inland sites, two of which are still in operation. The first quarry to be worked appears to have been Lanterdan at some point in the fifteenth century, while the last of the coastal quarries, Long Grass ceased operations in 1937. The remains of the coastal quarries occupy coastal land owned by the National Trust and most are easily accessible from the South West Coast Path. The Prince of Wales Quarry has been turned into a country park by North Cornwall District Council.

== Coastal quarries ==
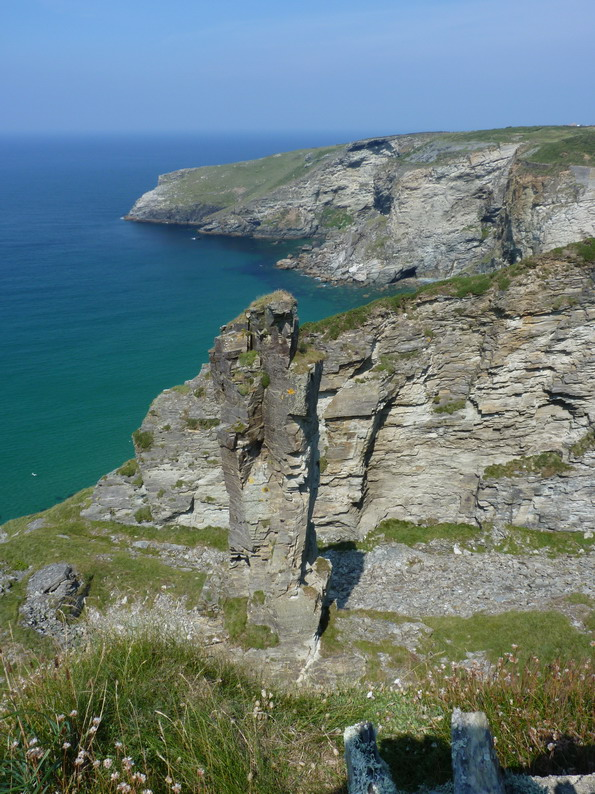
Lanterdan Quarry

- Dria
- Gillow
- Long Grass
- Lambshouse and Gull Point
- Bagalow
- Caroline
- Lanterdan
- West Quarry

== Inland quarries ==
- The Prince of Wales Quarry
- Bowithick Quarry
- Trevillet Quarry
- Trebarwith Road Rustic Quarry

== Wharfs ==
- Port William
- Penhallick Wharf
- Tintagel Haven

== The Slate ==
The working faces of the coastal quarries reach to the full height of the cliffs- 60 metres (200 ft) in the north and 100 metres (330 ft) in the south. The cliff top is relatively flat with no naturally occurring coves, bays or river valleys. The stone itself is Upper Devonian slate and Lower Carboniferous slate of a greyish green colour and was used predominantly for roofing while the rubble was useful for building. The slate closer to sea level is generally of better quality than that higher up.

== Quarrying in Tintagel ==
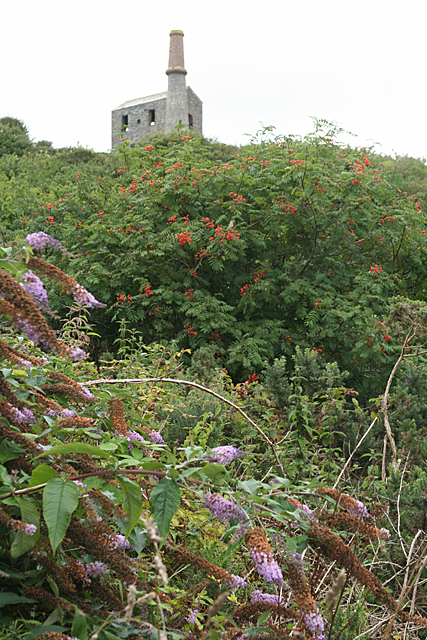
Prince of Wales Quarry

The southernmost cliff quarries (the southern end of Caroline as well as Lanterdan and West quarries) as well as the inland sites used conventional open cast stone extraction methods. However, clifftop quarrying provided unique challenges. Gillow, Long Grass, Lambshouse, Gull Point, Dria, Bagalow and the northern part of Caroline are sea cliffs where the slate workfaces were already exposed and which have simply been cut into.

Working the cliff face quarries will have involved clearing away any surface material such as soil, grass and loose stones and dumping them in the sea. A strong point will have been established on bedrock a short way back from the cliff edge. On the rock immediately above the cliff edge, a whim is built. This is a wooden frame with a pulley that is anchored at the strong point and operated by a donkey or horse walking in circles, often while blindfolded to avoid distractions.

Quarrying on the cliffs will have been a hazardous occupation with men suspended by ropes as they worked the vertical rock face. The whims were used to winch workers down and buckets of slate back up. The stone was extracted by hand using drills but also with explosives, and the value of the slate extracted clearly made this kind of hazardous and labour-intensive quarrying cost-effective.

The slate from the coastal quarries was dressed or split into thin, usable tiles in sheds at the top of the cliffs.

A good workman could split 100 dozen roofing slates in a day. Splitters worked 7.30am to 5.30pm with a half hour break. Some rag slates measured 6 ft by 2 ft, some were 18 inches square and sold at 2s.6d a dozen in 1888.

The slates were known by names relating to their size, which were (in inches): Queens 36x7, Duchess 24x14, Countesses 20x10, Ladies 16x9 and Doubles 12x7. Small roofing slates known as scantles measuring 9x5, 8x6,7x7 and 6x3 were cut by boys.

Slate from North Cornwall's quarries was used to make cisterns up to 2,000 gallons as well as corn chests, pig troughs, mangers, pump troughs, baths, salting troughs, milk coolers, larders, chimney tops, mantle pieces, window sills, garden edging and hedging, room skirting, lintels, quoins, rolling pins, candle sticks and ashtrays. Every Cornish churchyard has examples of slate headstones.

The finished stone was taken by tramways to be shipped from nearby wharves or transported by rail from Camelford Station. Any waste product was heaped up in spoil tips or if the quarry was by the coast, simply dumped in the sea.

== Industrial remains ==
The remains of whims, dressing sheds and food and powder stores litter the cliffs above the quarries. Most are in a ruinous state but the offices, powerhouse and smithy belonging to Long Grass quarry now serve as Tintagel's youth hostel. Well-preserved whims can be seen at Lambshouse and Caroline quarries and the remains of a toolshed perches on the clifftop above Caroline quarry. Caroline quarry also has a large cave hacked into the cliff face by quarrymen - the cave gives its name to Hole Beach, a surfing beach below the quarry workings. In between Gull Point and Dria quarries is Penhallick Wharf, an abandoned loading dock cut into the side of the cliff, and another disused wharf can be found at Port William to the north of Trebarwith Strand.

The most visible quarry building in Tintagel is the engine house at the Prince of Wales quarry. Built in 1870, this once housed a Woolf compound beam engine that both pumped water out of the pit and hauled trucks of slate from the workings at nearby Bowithick quarry. The building was restored in 1976.

== Legacy ==
Despite Tintagel having a centuries-old slate quarrying history, ever since the publication of Tennyson's Idylls of the King in 1859, the focus of tourism in the village has been on King Arthur. However these quarries are testament to an actual rather than a fictitious history. Despite many of them occupying a spectacular coastal location, there is currently no visitor centre, no tourists are directed here and the only informational signage in place is at the Prince of Wales site.
