= Lanterdan Quarry =

Disused slate quarry in Cornwall, England

Lanterdan Slate Quarry
- Interactive map of Lanterdan Slate Quarry
- Coordinates: 50.650°N 4.759°W

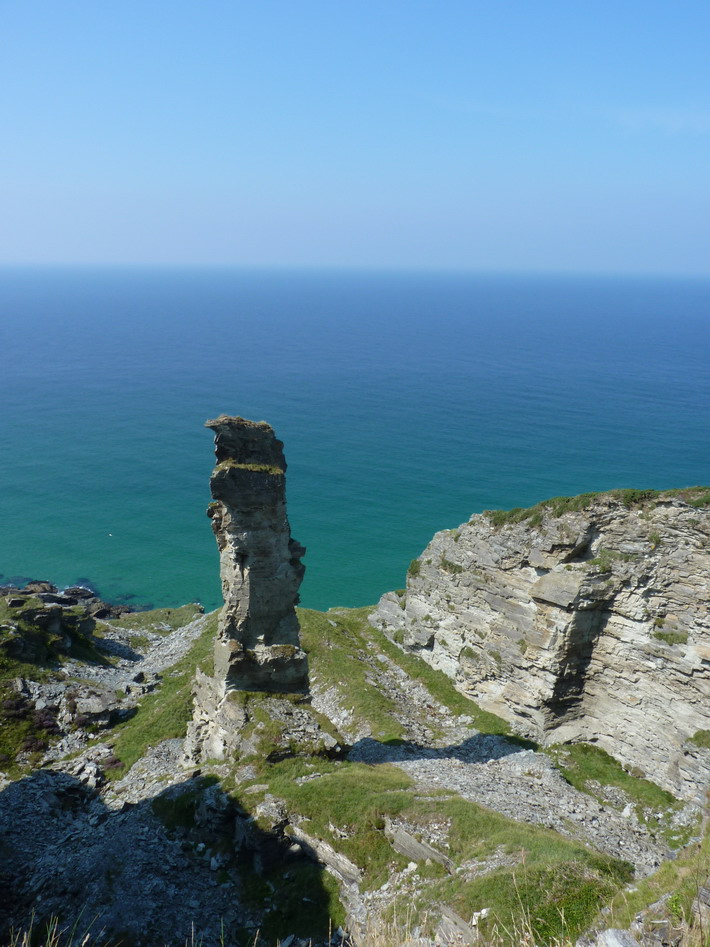
Lanterdan rock pinnacle

Lanterdan Quarry is a disused open cast slate quarry between Tintagel and Trebarwith on the north coast of Cornwall, South West England. The quarry is the oldest, largest and most spectacular of Tintagel’s coastal quarries and was worked from the fifteenth until the early twentieth century. A distinguishing feature of the quarry is a 25m high pinnacle of inferior slate.

== Location ==
The quarry lies south of Caroline Quarry immediately west of the village of Treknow. As the quarry is adjacent to Caroline and West quarries, it can be difficult to discern its exact boundaries. The quarry covers a 200m stretch of coastline but doesn’t reach as far as the water’s edge, making it more similar to the nearby inland workings at Prince of Wales and Bowithick quarries. The workings extend up to 80m inland and reach a height of around 30m. The quarry is clearly visible from the South West Coast Path and can also be reached by clambering over rocks from Trebarwith Strand and Hole beaches.

== The Stone ==
The quarry provided a source of Upper Devonian slate and Lower Carboniferous slates of an olive green or blue-black colour used predominantly for roofing. The rubble was used as building material.

== History ==
Lanterdan is the oldest of Tintagel’s slate quarries having been worked from the end of the fifteenth century. At least seven different quarries were cut into the cliffs here. In 1883, the quarry employed a solitary worker, Thomas Sweet and according to the 1907 OS map, Lanterdan was still in use at that date.

== Waste Disposal ==
Initially the unusable stone will have been deposited into the sea. As the quarry moved further inland, tramways will have taken the stone to the cliff edge where it will have been tipped into the water. Latterly, earlier worked parts of the quarry will have been backfilled.

== Industrial Remains ==
Lanterdan has by far the most ruined buildings of all Tintagel’s coastal quarries. The majority of these were temporary shelters or tool sheds and many of them are easily visible from the coastal path. Some might have been shelters for the horses and ponies used to power the whim pulleys used to lift the slate up and down the quarry walls. The buildings have been repurposed over the years by children, anglers and campers, making it hard for archaeologists to determine their original function. As the quarry workings moved inland, previously worked areas were backfilled, obliterating some of the older buildings. Four of these part-buried buildings will have been small splitting cabins - each measures around 2.5m by 1.3m. There are also remains of tramways that will have been used to take waste slate to the cliff edge.
