= Bossiney =

Village in Cornwall, England

Coordinates: 50°39′59″N 4°44′24″W

Bossiney: Cornish: Boskyni
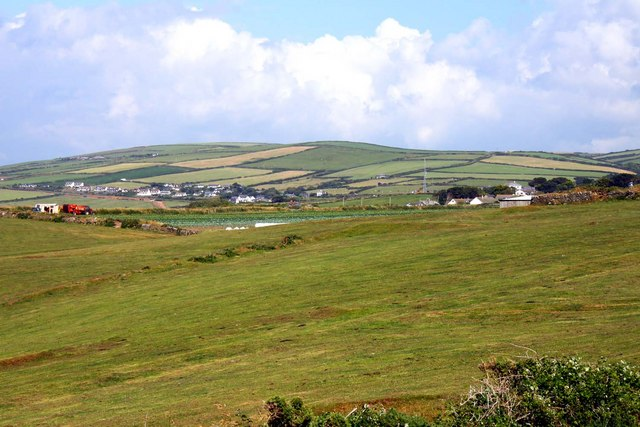
- Looking across fields towards Bossiney

- Location within Cornwall
- OS grid reference: SX066888
- Civil parish: Tintagel
- Shire county: Cornwall
- Region: South West
- Country: England
- Sovereign state: United Kingdom
- Post town: TINTAGEL
- Postcode district: PL34
- Dialling code: 01840
- Police: Devon and Cornwall
- Fire: Cornwall
- Ambulance: South Western
- UK Parliament: North Cornwall

Bossiney (Cornish: Boskyni, meaning Kyni's dwelling) is a village in north Cornwall, England, United Kingdom. It forms part of the civil parish of Tintagel, and lies north-east of Tintagel village. Further north-east are the Rocky Valley and Trethevy. Until 1832 the village, with its neighbour Tintagel, returned two MPs as a Rotten Borough, for the Bossiney constituency. The beach of Bossiney Haven is located nearby.

== Toponymy ==
Bossiney, which in Domesday Book was 'Botcinnii', has been explained in Cornish as: 'Bod-' ('dwelling') and 'Cini' (a man's name). The spelling varied in the past (Bossinney was at one time very common). Novelist John Galsworthy used 'Bosinney' as the surname of a character in the Forsyte Saga.

== History ==
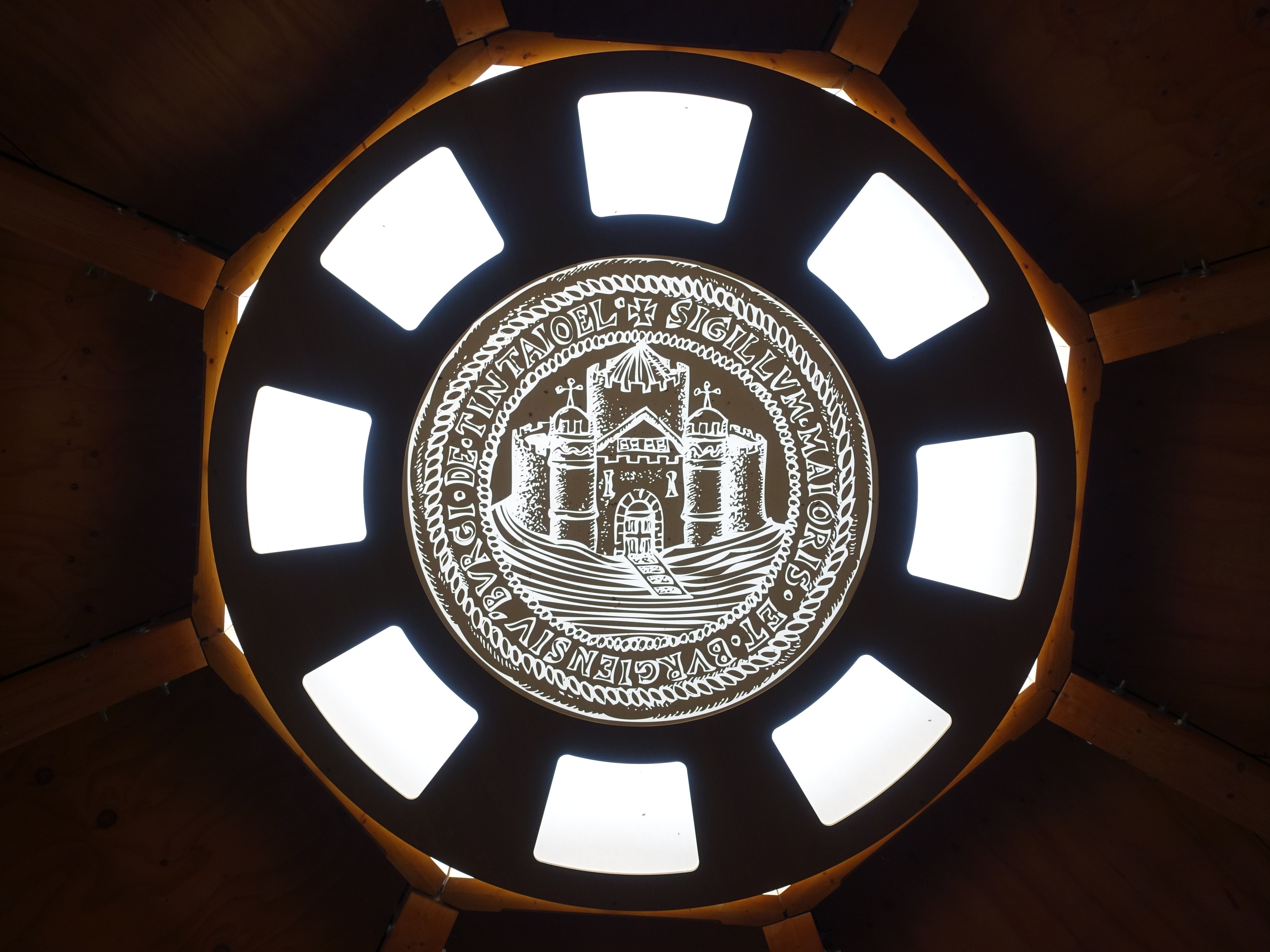
Replica of the borough seal

Bossiney was mentioned in Domesday Book as 'Botcinnii', a manor held by the Count of Mortain from St. Petroc's Church (i.e. Bodmin Monastery), the manor at this time including Trevena.

A borough was established by Richard, Earl of Cornwall in the 13th century, which was generally known as Bossiney, but which was also called "Bossiney and Trevena", Trevena being the name by which Tintagel village was then known. The name Tintagel was used for the wider parish which included both Bossiney and Trevena and surrounding areas.

The borough served as a constituency for parliamentary elections from 1547, as the Bossiney parliamentary borough, electing two members of parliament. Notable MPs for the constituency included Francis Bacon, elected in 1581, and Francis Drake, elected in 1584.

The mace and seal of the borough are still preserved and show the name of the borough as 'Tintaioel' (they are thought to be from the 16th century). Despite electing two MPs, the borough of Bossiney in the 18th century was described as "a very small place with scarcely twenty houses and those no better than cottages!"

The constituency came to be seen as a rotten borough, controlled by certain landowners. A survey in 1831 found that Bossiney had the sixth smallest electorate among English constituencies. It was abolished under the Reform Act 1832. After the abolition of the constituency, the borough went into terminal decline, as its primary function had come to be running parliamentary elections. A mayor continued to be appointed until 1841, but no mayors were appointed after 1841 and the borough effectively ceased to operate. The 1841 census reported that the population of Bossiney was 87. Any residual claim Bossiney may have had to being a borough was extinguished in 1886 under the Municipal Corporations Act 1883.

== Places of interest ==
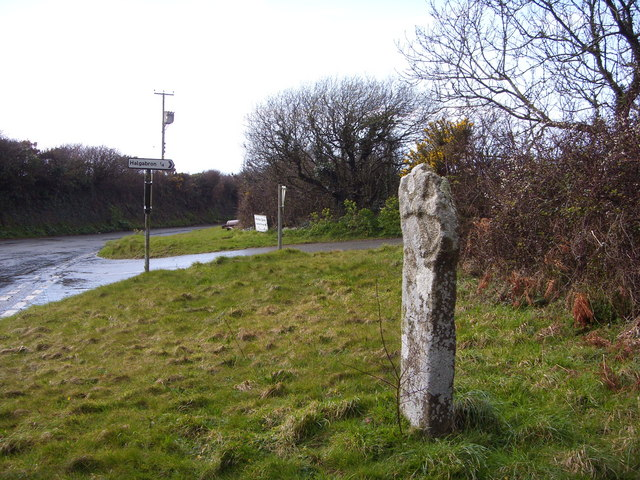
Hendra Cross

Bossiney lies within the Cornwall Area of Outstanding Natural Beauty (AONB). A nearby beach is known as Bossiney Haven.

Notable buildings include the Old Borough House, Bossiney Court (both houses are 17th century and later) and the Methodist chapel (1860). All these are listed Grade II. At the nearby crossroads stands Hendra Cross or Pentaly Cross (towards Trevillet): it has been moved from its former position due to road widening in 1959 ("about one and half miles north east of Bossiney, at Pentaly"). Some folklore relating to this cross has been recorded: a writer in 1921 recollects that about 40 years earlier he had stopped at the cross to sketch it and was told by the farmer of the nearby fields that the cross had been overthrown some time before and when it was set up again a number of small bottles full of water containing many pins had been found buried beneath it (the bottles being a charm against being ill-wished).

Willapark on the coast nearby was an Iron Age cliff castle and at Lye Rock the barque 'Iota' was wrecked in 1893 (see the Tintagel article). Willapark Manor stands in wooded grounds and is now an hotel; Jill Pool is the site of the former borough jail.

To the east of Bossiney lie the remains of an earthen Norman fortification (Bossiney Castle), which were discovered during archaeological excavations during the 1840s. It is likely to have been a motte castle as there are no signs of a bailey. The castle is not mentioned in surviving contemporary documents, and it is uncertain when or by whom it was built. However, it was probably built in the late 11th or 12th century.

== See also ==
- Bossiney (UK Parliament constituency)
- Lye Cove
