= West Quarry =

Disused slate quarry

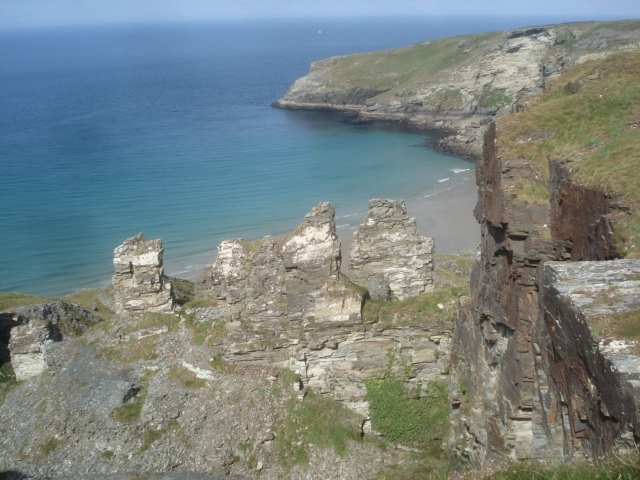
- Rock pinnacles in West Quarry
- Interactive map of West Quarry
- Coordinates: 50.649°N 4.759°W

West Quarry is a disused open cast slate quarry between Tintagel and Trebarwith on the north coast of Cornwall, South West England. The quarry ceased operations towards the end of the nineteenth century.

== Location ==
The quarry is one of at least eight coastal quarries that lie between Tintagel Castle and Trebarwith Strand. West quarry is the southernmost of these and adjoins Lanterdan. It can be hard to determine where Lanterdan ends and West begins and so a convenient demarcation is a row of slate pinnacles running roughly east to west. These towers are composed of inferior slate, which is why they have not been worked, and everything due south can be considered West Quarry. The quarry workings can be seen easily from the South West Coast Path.

== Industrial remains ==
Two rock faces appear to have been worked, both around 50 m (165 ft) in length. The quarry floor is around 30 m (100 ft) below the cliffs. There are virtually no remains of buildings. The ruined walls of small sheds that can still be seen may have been built after the quarry ceased operations, and it is unclear what function they served.

== Stone ==
The quarry provided a source of Upper Devonian slate and Lower Carboniferous slates of a greyish green colour used predominantly for roofing.

== History ==
According to OS map history, the quarry was already disused by 1883 The quarries on this stretch of coast possibly date back to the 17th century-nearby Lanterdan was in use as early as the fifteenth century.
