= List of shipwrecks in March 1869 =

The list of shipwrecks in March 1869 includes ships sunk, foundered, grounded, or otherwise lost during March 1869.

== 1 March ==
List of shipwrecks: 1 March 1869
Ship	State	Description
Alford	United Kingdom	The lighter collided with the yacht Neptune (United Kingdom) and sank in the Clyde. Her crew were rescued. She was on a voyage from Campbeltown, Argyllshire to Port Glasgow, Renfrewshire.
Arcturus	United Kingdom	The barque ran aground on a reef north of Makronisos, Greece.
Arnoldi	United Kingdom	The schooner struck a bridge and sank at Goole, Yorkshire. Her four crew were rescued. She was on a voyage from Perth to Selby, Yorkshire.
Cambria	United Kingdom	The steamship was wrecked at Piraino, Sicily, Italy with the loss of 22 of the 32 people on board. She was on a voyage from Trieste to London.
Canadian	United Kingdom	The ship was wrecked on Hoy, Orkney Islands. Her 22 crew were rescued. She was on a voyage from Dundee, Forfarshire to Havana, Cuba.
Clifton Hall	United Kingdom	The ship foundered off Hoy with the loss of a crew member.
Coronella	United Kingdom	The ship struck a rock in Wigtown Bay and was abandoned by her crew. She was on a voyage from Maryport, Cumberland to Dublin.
Eliza	Sweden	The barque was wrecked on Levisa Key. She was on a voyage from Cardiff, Glamorgan, United Kingdom to Havana.
Hero	United Kingdom	The ship was wrecked on the Jadder, in the North Sea. Her crew were rescued. She was on a voyage from Wick, Caithness to Stettin.
Johanna Maria	Netherlands	The ship was wrecked on the Knechtsand, in the North Sea. She was on a voyage from Middlesbrough, Yorkshire to Schiedam, South Holland.
Melba	United Kingdom	The ship ran aground at Saint Lucia. She was on a voyage from London to Saint Lucia.
Rover's Bride	United Kingdom	The yawl was driven ashore at Fort Matilda, Renfrewshire. She was on a voyage from Glasgow, Renfrewshire to Dublin.

== 2 March ==
List of shipwrecks: 2 March 1869
Ship	State	Description
Amelia	United Kingdom	The ship ran aground on the Holm Sand and sank. Her crew were rescued by Anna Louisa (United Kingdom).
Ant	United Kingdom	The ship was driven ashore at Margate, Kent. She was on a voyage from London to Bristol, Gloucestershire. She was refloated on 13 March and taken in to Margate.
Camilla	United Kingdom	The steamship ran aground at Waterford. She was on a voyage from Waterford to Liverpool, Lancashire. She was refloated with assistance from the tug William Wallace and resumed her voyage.
Derbyshire	United Kingdom	The ship ran aground on the Futtah Sands, in the Hooghly River. She was on a voyage from Liverpool to Calcutta, India. She was refloated and completed her voyage.
Economist	United Kingdom	The trow was driven ashore at Burnham-on-Sea, Somerset.
Francis	United Kingdom	The ship was driven ashore at Kessingland, Suffolk. She was on a voyage from London to Middlesbrough, Yorkshire. She had become a wreck by 4 March.
Jean Lithgow	United Kingdom	The ship was driven ashore at and severely damaged at Popton Point, Pembrokeshire. She was on a voyage from Troon, Ayrshire to Trinidad. She was refloated and beached at Milford Haven. Pembrokeshire. She was refloated on 14 March and taken in to Milford Haven.
Lerida	France	The ship was driven ashore and wrecked at Havre de Grâce, Seine-Inférieure with the loss of two of her crew. She was on a voyage from Haiti to Havre de Grâce.
Providence	United Kingdom	The trow was driven ashore at Burnham-on-Sea.
Rose	United Kingdom	The ship was driven ashore near Rye, Sussex. She was on a voyage from London to Poole, Dorset.
Safety	United Kingdom	The trow was driven ashore at Burnham-on-Sea.
Waterwitch	United Kingdom	The brig foundered in the North Sea off Ostend, West Flanders, Belgium. Her crew survived. She was on a voyage from South Shields, County Durham to Rotterdam, South Holland, Netherlands.
Unnamed	Spain	The schooner was abandoned off Lundy Island, Devon, United Kingdom. Her crew survived.

== 3 March ==
List of shipwrecks: 3 March 1869
Ship	State	Description
Annie	United States	The full-rigged ship was abandoned in the Atlantic Ocean 80 nautical miles (150 km) west of Ouessant, Finistère, France. All 22 people on board were rescued by the schooner Arrow. Annie was on a voyage from Antwerp, Belgium to Callao, Peru.
Clara Lamb	United Kingdom	The ship was driven ashore at Garston, Lancashire. She was on a voyage from the Rio de la Hacha to Liverpool, Lancashire.
Diana	United Kingdom	The brig was driven ashore at Orfordness, Suffolk. She was refloated with the assistance of the boat Turtle and the smack Volunteer (both United Kingdom)
Olive	United Kingdom	The schooner was driven ashore at Goswick, Northumberland. She was on a voyage from Aberdeen to Newcastle upon Tyne, Northumberland.
Reyna	Netherlands	The ship collided with another vessel and was abandoned by her crew. She was on a voyage from Hull, Yorkshire, United Kingdom to Cette, Hérault, France. She was taken in to Dover, Kent, United Kingdom in a derelict condition.
Sisters	United Kingdom	The ship was wrecked at Cape Wrath, Caithness with the loss of all hands. She was on a voyage from Granton, Lothian to Montevideo, Uruguay.
Tarsit	United Kingdom	The steamship was abandoned in the Bay of Biscay. Her crew were rescued by Berglund (Sweden). Tarsit was on a voyage from Trieste to Bristol, Gloucestershire.
Vigilant	United Kingdom	The ship sank at Sharpness, Gloucestershire.

== 4 March ==
List of shipwrecks: 4 March 1869
Ship	State	Description
Aberystwyth	United Kingdom	The steamship ran aground on McKenny's Bank. She was on a voyage from Londonderry to the Isle of Skye. She was refloated and resumed her voyage.
Acasta	United Kingdom	The barque ran aground off Penarth, Glamorgan. She was on a voyage from Cardiff, Glamorgan to Constantinople, Ottoman Empire. She was refloated and taken in to Bristol, Gloucestershire in a leaky condition.
Alliance	United States	The ship was wrecked in the Hatteras Inlet.
Eliza	United Kingdom	The schooner foundered 3 nautical miles (5.6 km) west of Caldy Island, Pembrokeshire. She was on a voyage from Saundersfoot to Milford Haven.
Emily	United Kingdom	The ship ran aground at Penarth, Glamorgan and broke her back. She was on a voyage from Cardiff, Glamorgan to Galaţi, Ottoman Empire. She was refloated on 6 March and put back to Cardiff in a leaky condition.
Freerk Jan	Netherlands	The smack sprang a leak and was abandoned by her crew, who were rescued by the smack Bravo (United Kingdom), which assisted Freerk Jan in to Great Yarmouth, Norfolk, United Kingdom. Freerk Jan was on a voyage from Amsterdam, North Holland to Nantes, Loire-Inférieure, France.
Gleaner	United Kingdom	The schooner ran aground at Ballina, County Mayo.
Hero	United Kingdom	The ship was wrecked on the Norwegian coast. Her crew were rescued. She was on a voyage from Wick, Caithness to a Baltic port.
Lena	United Kingdom	The brigantine sprang a leak and foundered in the English Channel off Dungeness, Kent. Her crew survived. She was on a voyage from Sunderland, County Durham to Saint-Malo, Ille-et-Vilaine, France.
Orkney Lass	United Kingdom	The ship was driven ashore at "Laberbenoit", Finistère, France. She was on a voyage from South Shields, County Durham to Boston, Massachusetts, United States.
Richard	United Kingdom	The ship was damaged by fire at Cardiff.
Visitor	United Kingdom	The schooner struck a rock off Islay and was abandoned by her crew. She was on a voyage from Liverpool, Lancashire to Morrison's Haven, Lothian. She came ashore in Macrihanish Bay.

== 5 March ==
List of shipwrecks: 5 March 1869
Ship	State	Description
Annie Rosetta	United Kingdom	The ship capsized at Great Yarmouth, Norfolk.
Brenda	United Kingdom	The ship was driven ashore on Oyster Island, County Sligo.
Doddington	United Kingdom	The schooner was wrecked on the Nicholas Rock, on the coast of Ayrshire. Her crew were rescued by the Ayr Lifeboat Glasgow Workman ( Royal National Lifeboat Institution). Doddington was on a voyage from Glasgow, Renfrewshire to Wigtown.
Faugh-a-Ballaugh	United Kingdom	The ship was driven ashore at Troon, Ayrshire. She was on a voyage from Londonderry to Troon.
Harriet	United Kingdom	The ship ran aground at Lindisfarne, Northumberland. She was on a voyage from London to Arbroath, Forfarshire.
Iceni	United Kingdom	The ship was beached at the mouth of the Chemelecón River. She was on a voyage from the Ulna River to Liverpool, Lancashire.
Margaret and Elizabeth	United Kingdom	The brigantine ran aground off Ryde, Isle of Wight. She was on a voyage from Middlesbrough, Yorkshire to Newport, Isle of Wight.
Missouri	United States	The ship ran aground was driven ashore at Greenock, Renfrewshire. She was on a voyage from Liverpool to Greenock.
Ocean Wave	United Kingdom	The ship ran aground off Caister-on-Sea, Norfolk. She was refloated.
Pantheon	United Kingdom	The steamship collided with the tug Heroine (United States) and sank at the mouth of the Mississippi River. She was on a voyage from New Orleans, Louisiana, United States to Liverpool.
Roe	United Kingdom	The steamship ran aground at Queen's Island, County Antrim. Her passengers were taken off. She was on a voyage from Barrow-in-Furness, Lancashire to Belfast, County Antrim. She was refloated and taken in to Belfast.
Tipperary Lass	United Kingdom	The Galway hooker foundered at Waterford with the loss of all hands. She was on a voyage from Queenstown, County Cork to Waterford, or from Dungarvan, County Waterford to Cork. She was taken in to Tramore Bay in a derelict condition.

== 6 March ==
List of shipwrecks: 6 March 1869
Ship	State	Description
Augustus E. Price	United States	The fishing schooner sank in a gale on the Georges Bank. Lost with all 11 crew.
Ellen	United Kingdom	The smack was run into by a barge and foundered in the North Sea 85 nautical miles (157 km) off Great Yarmouth, Norfolk. Her crew were rescued by the barque, except for her captain, who reached Norfolk safely.
Hero	United Kingdom	The tug sank in Loch Ryan. She was refloated on 12 March and taken in to Belfast, County Antrim by the tug Zealous (United Kingdom).
Josiah Johnson	United States	She was struck and sank by the schooner Wanata off of Barnegat, New Jersey. The accident happened at night when the wind was strong and the Wanata's lights had blown out.
Charles A. Stetson	United States	The fishing schooner sank in a gale on the Georges Bank. All 9 hands lost.

== 7 March ==
List of shipwrecks: 7 March 1869
Ship	State	Description
Abigail C. Woodbury	United States	The fishing schooner sank in a gale on the Georges Bank. All 11 hands lost.
A. R. Andrews	United States	The fishing schooner sank in a gale on the Georges Bank. Crew saved.
James Cucklow	United Kingdom	The schooner ran aground on the Barnard Sand, in the North Sea off the coast of Suffolk. Her seven crew were rescued by the Pakefield Lifeboat Sisters ( Royal National Lifeboat Institution). James Cucklow was on a voyage from Ipswich, Suffolk to Perth.
Michigan	United States	The ship was towed in to Lisbon, Portugal in a derelict condition. She was on a voyage from Quebec City, Canada to Liverpool, Lancashire, United Kingdom. She was condemned. Michigan was destroyed by explosives in early May.

== 8 March ==
List of shipwrecks: 8 March 1869
Ship	State	Description
Collina	United Kingdom	The schooner sprang a leak and sank off Pladda. Her four crew were rescued by the fishing smack Albion (United Kingdom). Collina was on a voyage from Paisley, Renfrewshire to Belfast, County Antrim.
Fame	United Kingdom	The ship collided with Keola (United Kingdom) and sank at Maryport, Cumberland.
Rapid	United Kingdom	The barque was wrecked on the Anegada Reefs, off the Virgin Islands. Her crew survived. She was on a voyage from "Goree", Africa to Cienfuegos, Cuba.
Rover	United States	The steamship foundered in the Atlantic Ocean.
Sisters	United Kingdom	The brig was wrecked on Anegada, Virgin Islands with the loss of six of her ten crew. She was on a voyage from Swansea, Glamorgan to Saint Thomas, Virgin Islands.
Tritonia	United States	The ship foundered in the Mediterranean Sea 15 nautical miles (28 km) south of Syracuse, Sicily, Italy. Her twelve crew were rescued by the steamship Electrice (Italy). She was on a voyage from Alexandria, Egypt to New York.

== 9 March ==
List of shipwrecks: 9 March 1869
Ship	State	Description
Blue Jacket	United States	The clipper was abandoned four days after her cargo caught fire in the South Atlantic Ocean off the Falkland Islands. Her nine survivors were rescued on 16 March by the barque Pyrmont (Hamburg).
Liberty	United Kingdom	The schooner ran aground on the Leigh Middle Sand, in the Thames Estuary. She was on a voyage from Portland, Dorset to London.

== 10 March ==
List of shipwrecks: 10 March 1869
Ship	State	Description
Ann	United Kingdom	The collier was driven ashore at Flamborough Head, Yorkshire. Her crew were rescued.
Anns	United Kingdom	The collier was driven ashore at Flamborough Head. Her crew were rescued. Anns was on a voyage from King's Lynn, Norfolk to Seaham, County Durham. She had become a wreck by 12 March.
Azalia	United Kingdom	The collier was driven ashore at Flamborough Head. Her crew were rescued.
Belt	United Kingdom	The collier was driven ashore at Flamborough Head. Her crew were rescued. Belt was on a voyage from London to Sunderland, County Durham. She had become a wreck by 12 March.
Circe	United Kingdom	The collier was driven ashore at Flamborough Head. Her crew were rescued. Circe was on a voyage from King's Lynn to Seaham. She had become a wreck by 12 March.
Duke	United Kingdom	The collier was driven ashore at Flamborough Head. Her crew were rescued.
Eliza	United Kingdom	The collier was driven ashore at Flamborough Head. Her crew were rescued.
Jane	United Kingdom	The collier was driven ashore at Flamborough Head. Her crew were rescued.
Marie Louise	France	The ship foundered in the Mediterranean Sea off the coast of Hérault with the loss of all hands.
Monck	United Kingdom	The ship was sighted in the South Atlantic whilst on a voyage from River Tyne to Caldera, Chile. No further trace, presumed foundered with the loss of all hands.
Red Jacket	United Kingdom	The schooner ran aground on the Barber Sand, in the North Sea off the coast of Norfolk. She was refloated and assisted in to Great Yarmouth, Norfolk.
Oscar	United Kingdom	The collier was driven ashore at Flamborough Head. Her crew were rescued.
Risk	United Kingdom	The collier was driven ashore at Flamborough Head. Her crew were rescued. Risk was on a voyage from Rochester, Kent to Sunderland. She had become a wreck by 12 March.
Unnamed	United Kingdom	The smack was run down and sunk by Earl of Durham 4 nautical miles (7.4 km) north of Winterton-on-Sea, Norfolk with the loss of all hands.

== 11 March ==
List of shipwrecks: 11 March 1869
Ship	State	Description
Agnes Campbell	United Kingdom	The ship ran aground on Scroby Sands, Norfolk. She was on a voyage from London to Dundee, Forfarshire. She was refloataed and resumed her voyage, but put in to Grimsby, Lincolnshire in a leaky condition.
Betsey	United Kingdom	The ship was abandoned in the Atlantic Ocean 200 nautical miles (370 km) west of Cape St. Vincent, Portugal. She was on a voyage from Swansea, Glamorgan to Madeira.
Prosperity	United Kingdom	The smack ran aground on the East Hoyle Sandbank, in Liverpool Bay and was severely damaged. Her crew were rescued by a lifeboat. She was on a voyage from Liverpool, Lancashire to Pwllheli, Caernarfonshire.

== 12 March ==
List of shipwrecks: 12 March 1869
Ship	State	Description
Caradoc	United Kingdom	The steamship ran aground at Falsterbo, Sweden. She was on a voyage from Stettin to Leith, Lothian. She was refloated the next day and resumed her voyage.
Czar	United Kingdom	The ship was damaged by fire at Hull, Yorkshire.
John O'Gaunt	United Kingdom	The ship was wrecked at Cardigan. She was on a voyage from Liverpool, Lancashire to Calcutta, India.
Orwell	United Kingdom	The ship was driven ashore at Saint Mawes, Cornwall. She was on a voyage from Ipswich, Suffolk to Bridgwater, Somerset. She was refloated the next day and found to be leaky.
Rambler	United Kingdom	The ship caught fire. She was on a voyage from London to Berbice, British Guiana. She put back to London.
Silver Cloud	United Kingdom	The cutter was run down by the steamship Earl of Durham (United Kingdom) in the North Sea off the coast of Norfolk with the loss of all seven crew. The wreck ran onto the Haisborough Sands.

== 13 March ==
List of shipwrecks: 13 March 1869
Ship	State	Description
Daphne	United Kingdom	The ship was wrecked on the Futtah Sands, in the Hooghly River. She was on a voyage from Calcutta, India to Mauritius.
Energie	Netherlands	The brig was run down and sunk in the Atlantic Ocean by a Spanish brig. Her crew were rescued by Linda (United Kingdom).
Frances and Ann	United Kingdom	The ship was abandoned off The Manacles. She was on a voyage from Plymouth, Devon to Dublin. She came ashore at Coverack, Cornwall and was wrecked.
Louis	United Kingdom	The ship ran aground on Inchkeith. She was on a voyage from Saint-Valery-sur-Somme, Somme to Leith, Lothian. She was refloated and taken in to Leith in a sinking condition.

== 14 March ==
List of shipwrecks: 14 March 1869
Ship	State	Description
Charles Poole	United Kingdom	The ship was wrecked on Inagua, Bahamas. She was on a voyage from Cardiff, Glamorgan to Havana, Cuba.
Ellen	United Kingdom	The schooner was run down in the English Channel 15 to 20 nautical miles (28 to 37 km) off The Lizard, Cornwall with the loss of three of her four crew.
Moro Castle	United Kingdom	The ship was wrecked on the Galloper Sands. Her crew took to two boats. Those in one of the boat were rescued by a brig. Nine crew in the other boat were reported missing. Moro Castle was on a voyage from Christiania, Norway to Waterford.
Slyboots	United Kingdom	The schooner was driven ashore on the north coast of Corfu, Greece.
Sunderland	(United Kingdom of Great Britain and Ireland) Jersey	The ship sprang a leak and foundered in the Atlantic Ocean 200 nautical miles (370 km) off Cape Clear Island, County Cork. Her eighteen crew were rescued by the barque Franco (Italy) Sunderland was on a voyage from Liverpool, Lancashire to Boston, Massachusetts, United States.

== 15 March ==
List of shipwrecks: 15 March 1869
Ship	State	Description
Continental	United Kingdom	The ship was driven ashore at Gibraltar. She was on a voyage from Cardiff, Glamorgan to Yokohama, Japan. She was later refloated.
Jeune Eugenie	France	The ship caught fire and was scuttled in the Cordemais Channel. She was refloated on 6 April and towed in to Nantes, Loire-Inférieure.
Orion	Prussia	The schooner was abandoned in the Atlantic Ocean (39°50′N 5°17′W). Her crew were rescued by the brig Carolina (Italy). Orion was on a voyage from Antwerp, Belgium to Carloforte, Sardinia, Italy.
Rapid	United Kingdom	The ship was driven ashore at Dungeness, Kent. Her crew were rescued. She was on a voyage from Poole, Dorset to London. She was refloated and taken in to Dover, Kent in a derelict condition.
Romaine	United Kingdom	The brig was driven ashore at Cape Henlopen, Delaware, United States. She was on a voyage from Liverpool, Lancashire to Philadelphia, Pennsylvania, United States.

== 16 March ==
List of shipwrecks: 16 March 1869
Ship	State	Description
Ellen	United Kingdom	The ship collided with the schooner Albion (Norway) off The Lizard, Cornwall with the loss of three of her crew. Albion towed her in to Penzance, Cornwall in a severely damaged condition.
Mary	United Kingdom	The schooner ran aground on the Blacktail Sand, in the Thames Estuary. She was on a voyage from Perth to London.
Principio	Italy	The ship was driven ashore near and wrecked Pachino, Sicily. Her crew were rescued. She was on a voyage from Smyrna, Ottoman Empire to Gloucester, United Kingdom.
Southwick	United Kingdom	The ship departed from Sunderland, County Durham for Alexandria, Egypt. No further trace, presumed foundered with the loss of all hands.

== 17 March ==
List of shipwrecks: 17 March 1869
Ship	State	Description
Guide	United Kingdom	The brig foundered off the coast of Norway. Her crew were rescued. She was on a voyage from South Shields, County Durham to Swinemünde, Prussia.
Lucerne	United Kingdom	The steamship was sighted off Dover, Kent whilst on a voyage from Middlesbrough, Yorkshire to Trieste. No further trace, presumed foundered with the loss of all hands.
Marmion	United Kingdom	The ship was driven ashore and wrecked near Pendennis Castle, Cornwall. Her six crew were rescued.

== 18 March ==
List of shipwrecks: 18 March 1869
Ship	State	Description
Glendougall	United Kingdom	The ship was driven ashore at Breaksea Point, Glamorgan. She was on a voyage from Newport, Monmouthshire to Penryn, Cornwall. She was refloated and taken in to Cardiff, Glamorgan.
Lord Palmerston	United Kingdom	The ship foundered. Her crew were rescued by the barque Amelia Ross (United Kingdom). Lord Palmerston was on a voyage from Liverpool, Lancashire to Calcutta, India.
Margaret	United Kingdom	The barque was abandoned in the Atlantic Ocean. Her crew were rescued by Angelica (Flag unknown). Margaret Dundas was on a voyage from Swansea, Glamorgan to Alexandria, Egypt.

== 19 March ==
List of shipwrecks: 19 March 1869
Ship	State	Description
Amelia	(United Kingdom of Great Britain and Ireland) Guernsey	The ship sank at Havre de Grâce, Seine-Inférieure, France.
America	Prussia	The brig was wrecked on the Hull Sand, in the North Sea.
Ann Jones	United Kingdom	The brig was wrecked at Bossiney Haven, Cornwall with the loss of four of her eight crew. She was on a voyage from Plymouth, Devon to Cardiff, Glamorgan.
Brathan	United Kingdom	The sloop was driven ashore. She was on a voyage from Lydney to Bristol, Gloucestershire.
Bristol	United Kingdom	The schooner was wrecked at Padstow, Cornwall with the loss of three of her crew.
Brothers	United Kingdom	The ship sank in Walton Bay with the loss of a crew member. She was later refloated and towed in to Bristol.
Champion	United Kingdom	The cutter was wrecked near Horsey, Norfolk.
Christian	United Kingdom	The sloop collided with the sloop Vivid (United Kingdom) and sank at Brixham, Devon.
Confiance	France	The ship was driven ashore at Cherbourg, Seine-Inférieure. Her crew survived.
David	United Kingdom	The ketch foundered. She was on a voyage from Lydney to Bridgwater, Somerset.
Devitz	Prussia	The barque was wrecked at Padstow with the loss of all hands. She was on a voyage from Queenstown, County Cork to Gloucester, United Kingdom.
Empress	United Kingdom	The ketch foundered. her crew were rescued. She was on a voyage from Lydney to Bridgwater.
Eucharis Paul	France	The ship was driven ashore at Cherbourg.
Eugene	France	The brig was driven ashore at Saint-Servan, Ille-et-Vilaine.
Fanny	United Kingdom	The brig was driven ashore at Senneville-sur-Fécamp, Seine-Inférieure. Her crew were rescued.
Fisher	United Kingdom	The smack was driven ashore at Brixham. Her crew were rescued.
Flaneur	France	The brig was driven ashore at Saint-Servan.
Flaven	Austria-Hungary	The brig was driven ashore at Padstow. Her crew were rescued. She was on a voyage from Falmouth to Gloucester.
Francisco	Italy	The barque was abandoned in the Bristol Channel 30 nautical miles (56 km) west of Lundy Island, Devon. All seventeen people on board were rescued by the Ilfracombe Lifeboat, assisted by the tug Susan Gibbs (United Kingdom). Francisco was on a voyage from Spain to Cardiff. She was subsequently taken in to Ilfracombe by Susan Gibbs and the tug Aber (United Kingdom).
Freak	United Kingdom	The yacht sank at Brixham.
George Mary	United Kingdom	The ship was driven ashore. Her crew were rescued. she was on a voyage from Chepstow, Monmouthshire to Cardiff.
Helena	United Kingdom	The ship was driven ashore at Brixham. She was on a voyage from Liverpool, Lancashire to Melbourne, Victoria. She was refloated the next day and towed in to Brixham.
Ino	United Kingdom	The steamship ran aground at Sulina, Ottoman Empire. She was on a voyage from Cardiff to Sulina. She was refloated and towed in to Sulina.
Jeune Veuve	France	The smack was driven ashore at Brixham. Her crew were rescued.
John	United Kingdom	The steam barge was driven ashore in Walton Bay. Her crew were rescued. She was on a voyage from Cardiff to Bristol.
John Reeves	United Kingdom	The barge was driven ashore and wrecked at Penryn, Cornwall.
Jules	France	The brig was driven ashore at Saint-Servan.
Lark	United Kingdom	The ship was abandoned in the North Sea off Mablethorpe, Lincolnshire. Her crew were rescued. She was on a voyage from Barton-upon-Humber, Lincolnshire to King's Lynn, Norfolk.
Leonie-Celine	France	The ship was driven ashore at Cherbourg. Her crew survived.
Margaret Cook	United Kingdom	The brig was towed in to Havre de Grâce in a waterlogged condition by the tug Grand Emperor (France). Margaret Cook was on a voyage from Nantes, Loire-Inférieure, France to South Shields.
Mary Lloyd	United Kingdom	The schooner was driven ashore at Goodwick, Pembrokeshire. Her crew were rescued by the Fishguard Lifeboat Sir Edward Perrott ( Royal National Lifeboat Institution). Mary Lloyd was on a voyage from Portmadoc, Caernarfonshire to Littlehampton, Sussex.
Mercury	United Kingdom	The ship was driven ashore at St. Ives, Cornwall. Her crew were rescued by the St. Ives Lifeboat. She was on a voyage from Llanelly, Glamorgan to Dieppe, Seine-Inférieure, France.
Minnie	United Kingdom	The fishing smack was driven ashore at the mouth of the Humber.
Mogador	France	The brig was drvien ashore at Saint-Servan.
Nazeda	Flag unknown	The ship was wrecked at Portimão, Portugal. She was on a voyage from Oran, Algeria to Antwerp, Belgium.
Ocean	United Kingdom	The ship foundered in the Bristol Channel.
Oliva	United Kingdom	The steamship sank off Mandal, Norway. She was on a voyage from London to Danzig.
Pearce	United Kingdom	The schooner was wrecked on the Doom Bar. She was refloated and taken in to Padstow.
Proteus	United Kingdom	The brig was wrecked off the Hook Lighthouse, County Wexford. Her crew survived. She was on a voyage from Cardiff to Waterford.
Roebuck	United Kingdom	The smack foundered. Her crew were rescued. She was on a voyage from Lydney to Weston-super-Mare, Somerset.
Rosa	(United Kingdom of Great Britain and Ireland) Guernsey	The schooner was wrecked between Saint-Valery-en-Caux and Veulettes-sur-Mer, Seine-Inférieure with the loss of four lives.
Royal Adelaide	United Kingdom	The ship was driven ashore at Cherbourg. Her crew survived.
Sarah	United Kingdom	The schooner foundered 4 nautical miles (7.4 km) off Horsey.
Saint-Jean	France	The ship was driven ashore at Cherbourg. Her crew survived.
Saint-Louis	France	The ship was driven ashore at Cherbourg. Her crew survived.
Saucy Liz	United Kingdom	The smack was driven ashore at Brixham. Her cre were rescued.
Slaven	Austria-Hungary	The brig was abandoned off Padstow. All on board survived. She was on a voyage from Marianople, Russia to Gloucester.
Surprise	United Kingdom	The trow sank off the mouth of the River Avon with the loss of two of her crew. She was on a voyage from Bristol to Gloucester.
T. C.	United Kingdom	The schooner was driven ashore and wrecked 2 nautical miles (3.7 km) west of Portreath, Cornwall with the loss of three of her five crew.
Thomas and Ann	United Kingdom	The Yorkshire Billyboy foundered in the North Sea off Saltfleet, Lincolnshire. Her crew survived. She was on a voyage from King's Lynn to the Humber.
Victory	United Kingdom	The sailing barge sank between Portishead, Somerset and the mouht of the River Avon with the loss of two of her six crew.
William	United Kingdom	The ship foundered. Her crew were rescued. She was on a voyage from Newport, Monmouthshire to Oldbury-on-Severn, Gloucestershire.
William	United Kingdom	The smack foundered with the loss of her captain. She was on a voyage from Lydney to Bridgwater.
Eight unnamed vessels	United Kingdom	The sailing barges were driven ashore or sank at Appledore, Devon. Two crew on one of the barges were lost.
Two unnamed vessels	United Kingdom	The lighters sank at Appledore with the loss of both crew on board one of them.
Unnamed	France	The ship, a brig or schooner, was wrecked at Padstow with the loss of all hands, six of seven lives.

== 20 March ==
List of shipwrecks: 20 March 1869
Ship	State	Description
Algenoria	United Kingdom	The ship was driven ashore at Wells-next-the-Sea, Norfolk.
Barbara	United Kingdom	The schooner was beached at Salthouse, Norfolk. Her crew were rescued.
Brothers	United Kingdom	The brigantine was driven ashore at Appledore, Devon. She was on a voyage from Melbourne, Victoria to Bristol, Gloucestershire. She was refloated on 25 March and taken in to Bristol.
Cherub	United Kingdom	The schooner drove ashore and wrecked at Great Yarmouth, Norfolk. Her crew were rescued by the Coastguard using rocket apparatus or by the Yarmouth Lifeboat Duff ( Royal National Lifeboat Institution). Cherub was on a voyage from Goole, Yorkshire to Great Yarmouth.
Earnest	United Kingdom	The ketch was abandoned off the coast of Kent. Her four crew were rescued by the Margate Lifeboat Quiver ( Royal National Lifeboat Institution). Earnest came ashore in Infirmary Bay. She was later refloated and taken in to Ipswich, Suffolk, where she was repaired.
Edouard	France	The ship was abandoned at Havre de Grâce, Seine-Inférieure. Her crew were rescued by the Havre Lifeboat. She was towed in to Havre de Grâce by the tug Phenie (France).
Eliza	United Kingdom	The ship struck the Victoria Rock. She was on a voyage from Port Talbot, Glamorgan to Liverpool, Lancashire. She put in to Holyhead, Anglesey in a leaky condition.
Elizabeth Ann	United Kingdom	The schooner was driven onto the Longnose Rock, on the Kent coast. Her crew were rescued. She was on a voyage from Portmadoc, Caernarfonshire to London. She subsequently became a wreck.
Eschol	France	The ship was wrecked at San Sebastián, Spain. Her crew were rescued. She was on a voyage from Sunderland, County Durham, United Kingdom to Bayonne, Basses-Pyrénées.
Fame	United Kingdom	The schooner was driven ashore and wrecked at Hunstanton, Norfolk. Her crew were rescued by a fishing smack. She was on a voyage from London to Selby, Yorkshire.
Frances Anne	United Kingdom	The schooner was driven ashore and wrecked at Sheringham, Norfolk. Her three crew were rescued by the Sheringham Lifeboat Duncan ( Royal National Lifeboat Institution). Frances Anne was on a voyage from Maldon, Essex to Goole.
Frances Poole	United Kingdom	The schooner was driven ashore at Godrevy Head, Cornwall with the loss of all hands. She was on a voyage from Runcorn, Cheshire to Faversham, Kent.
Glynn	United Kingdom	The schooner was driven onto the Longnose Rock. Her crew were rescued. She subsequently became a wreck.
Hawke	United Kingdom	The brig was driven ashore and wrecked near Great Yarmouth. Her three crew were rescued by the Coastguard using rocket apparatus. She was on a voyage from South Shields, County Durham to London.
Horricks	United Kingdom	The ketch was abandoned off the Owers Sandbank, in the English Channel. Both crew were rescued by Otto (Hamburg).
Italian	United Kingdom	The steamship struck a sunken rock 12 nautical miles (22 km) off Cape Finisterre, Spain and sank with the loss of 26 of the 42 people on board. Survivors were rescued by the steamship Leda (United Kingdom). Italian was on a voyage from Trieste to Liverpool.
Jane Roberts	United Kingdom	The sloop collided with a landing stage and sank in the River Mersey at Liverpool.
Leander	United Kingdom	The Yorkshire Billyboy capsized and sank off Margate, Kent. Her crew were rescued by the lugger Eclipse (United Kingdom). She was on a voyage from Faversham, Kent to Antwerp, Belgium.
Lizzie	United Kingdom	The brig was driven ashore and wrecked at Hayle, Cornwall with the loss of one of her nine crew. Survivors were rescued by the Hayle Lifeboat Isis ( Royal National Lifeboat Institution). Lizzie was on a voyage from Minatitlán, Mexico to South Shields.
Magicienne	United Kingdom	The ship foundered in the Atlantic Ocean 150 nautical miles (280 km) north east of São Miguel Island, Azores. She was on a voyage form Milford Haven, Pembrokeshire to Halifax, Nova Scotia, Canada.
Mersey	United Kingdom	The schooner was driven onto the Longnose Rock. She was refloated on 25 March and taken in to Margate.
Osiris	Flag unknown	The ship departed from Aleppo, Ottoman Syria for Bordeaux, Gironde. No further trace, presumed foundered with the loss of all hands.
Pandora	United Kingdom	The schooner collided with another vessel and foundered 10 nautical miles (19 km) off the Dudgeon Sandbank, in the North Sea. Her crew were rescued by Amazon (United Kingdom). Pandora was on a voyage from Hartlepool, County Durham to Ramsgate, Kent.
Peters	Norway	The ship was wrecked at "Luc", Seine-Inférieure with loss of life. She was on a voyage from Kragerø to Liverpool.
Sylph	United Kingdom	The schooner foundered off St. Agnes, Cornwall with the loss of all hands.
Zosteria	United Kingdom	The brig was abandoned offSea Palling, Norfolk. Her six crew were rescued by the Palling Lifeboat Parsee ( Royal National Lifeboat Institution). Tosteria was on a voyage from London to Hartlepool, County Durham.
Unnamed	Italy	The ship was abandoned off Morte Point, Devon, United Kingdom. Her sixteen crew were rescued by the Ilfracombe Lifeboat Broadwater ( Royal National Lifeboat Institution).
Unnamed	United Kingdom	The brigantine ran aground on the Woolpack Sand, in the North Sea. She was refloated but sank off Hunstanton. Her crew were rescued by the smack Polly (United Kingdom).

== 21 March ==
List of shipwrecks: 21 March 1869
Ship	State	Description
Alice	Canada	The schooner sprang a leak and foundered.
Anna	United Kingdom	The ship was driven ashore at Saint-Valery-en-Caux, Seine-Inférieure. France. She was on a voyage from Caen, Calvados, France to Yarmouth, Isle of Wight.
Ariel	United Kingdom	The ship was driven ashore and wrecked at Lelant, Cornwall. Her six crew were rescued by the St. Ives Lifeboat Moses ( Royal National Lifeboat Institution).
Britannia	United Kingdom	The ship was driven ashore and wrecked west of Wells-next-the-Sea, Norfolk. She was on a voyage from Gravesend, Kent to Hull, Yorkshire.
Farmer	United Kingdom	The ship was wrecked north of Godrevy, Cornwall with the loss of all hands.
Fawn	United Kingdom	The schooner sprang a leak and sank in the North Sea 10 nautical miles (19 km) north east of Cromer, Norfolk. Her crew were rescued by the brig Leo (United Kingdom). Fawn was on a voyage from Middlesbrough, Yorkshire to Saint-Valery-sur-Somme, Somme, France.
Gemini	United Kingdom	The ship was driven ashore at Saint-Valery-en-Caux. She was on a voyage from Caen to Cardiff, Glamorgan.
George	United Kingdom	The Yorkshire Billyboy was wrecked at Runton, Norfolk. Her crew were rescued.
Lothian	United Kingdom	The brig ran aground in the Dardanelles. She was on a voyage from Blyth, Northumberland to Constantinople, Ottoman Empire. She had been refloated by 31 March.
Nelly	United Kingdom	The ship was driven ashore and wrecked at Dimlington, Yorkshire. Her crew were rescued by the Spurn Lifeboat. she was on a voyage from South Shields, County Durham to Wisbech, Cambridgeshire.
Sarah and Elizabeth	United Kingdom	The ship was wrecked at Weybourne, Norfolk. Her crew were rescued.
Sarah Williams	United Kingdom	The ship was driven ashore in Pulgeath Bay, Cornwall. Her crew were rescued. She was on a voyage from Portmadoc Caernarfonshire to Trieste.
Sincerity	United Kingdom	The Yorkshire Billyboy was wrecked at Sheringham, Norfolk. Her crew were rescued.
Undine	United Kingdom	The ship was abandoned off Corton, Suffolk. Her crew were rescued by the Gorleston Lifeboat. She was subsequently towed in to Lowestoft, Suffolk in a severely leaky condition.

== 22 March ==
List of shipwrecks: 22 March 1869
Ship	State	Description
Charles A. Stetson	United States	The Oystering schooner was wrecked on the Bat at the entrance to Indian River. Crew saved.
City of Limerick	United Kingdom	The steamship ran aground in the Scheldt at Walsoorden, Zeeland, Netherlands. She was on a voyage from Antwerp, Belgium to New York, United States. She was refloated.
Drago	Italy	The barque was driven ashore at Morte Point, Devon, United Kingdom. Her sixteen crew were rescued by the Ilfracombe Lifeboat Broadwater ( Royal National Lifeboat Institution).
Janet Mitchell	United Kingdom	The ship was driven ashore at "Satanelle", Calvados, or at "Lalanette", Seine-Inférieure, France.
Joseph et Marie	France	The schooner collided with the brig Ljubica (Austria-Hungary) and was abandoned 20 nautical miles (37 km) west of Cabo de Santa Maria, Portugal. Her seven crew were rescued by Linbica. Joseph et Marie was on a voyage from Huelva, Spain to Dunkirk, Nord, France.
Martha	United Kingdom	The ship was driven ashore at Burnham Overy Staithe, Norfolk.
Nell	United Kingdom	The brig collided with another vessel sank in the North Sea off Holmpton, Yorkshire. Her crew survived.
Sarah and Elizabeth	United Kingdom	The ship was wrecked at Weybourne, Norfolk.
Silesia	United Kingdom	The ship was wrecked at Le Conquet, Finistère, France. She was on a voyage from Rangoon, Burma to Falmouth, Cornwall.
South America	United Kingdom	The ship ran aground at Basseine, India.
Victoria Tatham	United Kingdom	The ship was driven ashore at Dungeness, Kent. She was refloated and resumed her voyage.

== 23 March ==
List of shipwrecks: 23 March 1869
Ship	State	Description
Ann	United Kingdom	The schooner was destroyed by fire in the Larne Lough.
Goodwood	United Kingdom	The ship was driven ashore at Barber's Point, in the Dardanelles. She was on a voyage from Newcastle upon Tyne, Northumberland to Constantinople, Ottoman Empire. She was refloated with the assistance of a tug and resumed her voyage.
Isabella Thurlbeck	United Kingdom	The ship was run ashore and wrecked at Audierne, Finistère, France. She was on a voyage from Liverpool to Ostend, West Flanders, Belgium.
Jean Bart	France	The ship was driven ashore at Perros, Côtes-du-Nord.
Mars	United Kingdom	The ship was driven ashore. She was on a voyage from Newcastle upon Tyne, Northumberland to Rotterdam, South Holland, Netherlands. She was refloated and taken in to Harwich, Essex in a leaky condition.
St. Antoine	France	The ship was driven ashore at Perros.

== 24 March ==
List of shipwrecks: 24 March 1869
Ship	State	Description
Energy	United Kingdom	The fishing smack ran aground on the Brake Sand. She was refloated and taken in to Ramsgate, Kent, where she sank.
Firkloveret	Norway	The ship was driven ashore and wrecked at Cape Henry, Virginia, United States. She was on a voyage from Liverpool, Lancashire, United Kingdom to Baltimore, Maryland, United States. She was refloated on 30 March and towed in to Norfolk, Virginia, where she was condemned.
Johann Paap	Flag unknown	The ship was driven ashore near Maldonado, Uruguay. She was on a voyage from Montevideo, Uruguay to an English port.

== 25 March ==
List of shipwrecks: 25 March 1869
Ship	State	Description
Deux Cousins	France	The ship was wrecked near Eu, Seine-Inférieure.
Juno	France	The steamship collided with the steamship Langley (United Kingdom) and sank at Le Verdon-sur-Mer, Gironde. Her crew were rescued. She was on a voyage from Bordeaux, Gironde to Glasgow, Renfrewshire, United Kingdom.
Thomas	United Kingdom	The barque collided with the steamship Echo and sank in the River Thames at Blackwall, Middlesex.

== 26 March ==
List of shipwrecks: 26 March 1869
Ship	State	Description
Mystery	(United Kingdom of Great Britain and Ireland) Queensland	The lugger, serving as a pilot cutter, was wrecked in Keppel Bay, Rockhampton, Queensland, Australia.

== 27 March ==
List of shipwrecks: 27 March 1869
Ship	State	Description
Cornubia	United Kingdom	The ship ran aground at Lisbon, Portugal. She was on a voyage from Newport, Monmouthshire to Lisbon. She was refloated and found to be severely leaky.
Cresswell	United Kingdom	The schooner was wrecked at Lindisfarne, Northumberland. Her crew were rescued. She was on a voyage from Montrose, Forfarshire to Sunderland, County Durham.
Prince Edward	United Kingdom	The brig struck floating wreckage and was abandoned 27 nautical miles (50 km) off Funchal, Madeira. Her crew survived. She was on a voyage from Belfast, County Antrim to Havana, Cuba. Prince Edward was boarded by some of the islanders and was beached on Madeira.

== 28 March ==
List of shipwrecks: 28 March 1869
Ship	State	Description
Annie Sharpe	United Kingdom	The barque was driven ashore and sank at the Shakespeare Cliff, Dover, Kent.
Ayrshire Lass	United Kingdom	The ship was abandoned off the Smalls Lighthouse, Pembrokeshire. Her crew were rescued by Avoca (United Kingdom). Ayrshire Lass was on a voyage from Kilrush, County Clare to Dublin.
Jane	United Kingdom	The schooner foundered off Great Orme Head, Caernarfonshire. All four people on board were rescued by the steamship Minia (United Kingdom). Jane was on a voyage from Laxey, Isle of Man to Chester, Cheshire.
Unnamed	Flag unknown	The brig sank off Porthcawl, Glamorgan, United Kingdom.

== 29 March ==
List of shipwrecks: 29 March 1869
Ship	State	Description
Elizabeth	United Kingdom	The brig was driven ashore in the Oostgat. She was on a voyage from Zierikzee, Zeeland, Netherlands to South Shields, County Durham. She was refloated and towed in to Vlissingen, Zeeland in a sinking condition.
Eschol	France	The ship was lost. She was on a voyage from Bayonne, Basses-Pyrénées to Sunderland, County Durham, United Kingdom.
HMS Ferret	Royal Navy	The brig was driven ashore and wrecked at Dover, Kent with the loss of one of her 106 crew. Survivors were rescued by the steamship Breeze (United Kingdom).
Jane	United Kingdom	The schooner foundered off Great Orme Head, Caernarfonshire. All four people on board were rescued by Minia (United Kingdom). .
John and Anne	United Kingdom	The ship was driven ashore and wrecked at Lowestoft, Suffolk. Her crew were rescued.
Marco	France	The ship was wrecked at Saint-Brieuc, Côtes-du-Nord.
Unnamed	Flag unknown	The brig foundered in the Atlantic Ocean 6 nautical miles (11 km) south west of the Isles of Scilly, United Kingdom with the loss of all hands.

== 30 March ==
List of shipwrecks: 30 March 1869
Ship	State	Description
Alma	United Kingdom	The ship sank at Skibbereen, County Cork. She was on a voyage from Cardiff, Glamorgan to Rosscarberry, County Cork.
Anna	United Kingdom	The brigantine was driven ashore and wrecked at Veulettes-sur-Mer, Seine-Inférieure, France.
Bussorah	United Kingdom	The ship ran aground at Harwich, Essex. She was refloated and taken in to Harwich.
HMS Charybdis	Royal Navy	The Pearl-class corvette was driven ashore in the Pacific Ocean. Subsequently refloated, repaired and returned to service.
Countess of Eglinton	United Kingdom	The ship ran aground on Campbell's Rock, off the coast of Ayrshire. She was refloated and taken in to Ardrossan.
Liberty	United Kingdom	The ship was driven ashore at Réville, Manche, France. She was on a voyage from Havre de Grâce, Seine-Inférieure, France to Guernsey, Channel Islands. She was refloated on 3 April.
Mentor	United Kingdom	The ship ran aground and was wrecked at Cuxhaven. She was on a voyage from Newcastle upon Tyne, Northumberland to Hamburg.
Onward	United Kingdom	The ship was driven ashore at Harwich. She was refloated and towed in to Harwich.
Sorento, or Sovinto	Spain	The ship struck a sunken wreck and was beached at Deal, Kent, United Kingdom. She was on a voyage from South Shields, County Durham, United Kingdom to Cádiz. She was refloated and taken in to The Downs before being towed to London for repairs.
Veleda	United Kingdom	The barque ran aground on the Kish Bank, in the Irish Sea. She was on a voyage from Liverpool, Lancashire to Malta. She was refloated and taken in to Kingstown, County Dublin.
Windermere	United Kingdom	The steamship ran aground in the Thames Estuary.

== 31 March ==
List of shipwrecks: 31 March 1869
Ship	State	Description
Ettine	United Kingdom	The ship ran aground at Greytown, Nicaragua. She was on a voyage from London to Greytown. She was refloated.
Sailor	United Kingdom	The fishing smack collided with the fishing smack Thrive and sank off the Dutch coast.

== Unknown date ==
List of shipwrecks: Unknown date in March 1869
Ship	State	Description
A. D. Rice	United States	The Oystering schooner was lost sometime in March, possibly in the Massachusetts area.
Albert	United Kingdom	The ship was abandoned in the Atlantic Ocean. Her crew were rescued. She was on a voyage from Savannah, Georgia, United States to Dundee, Forfarshire.
Alexander	Hamburg	The ship foundered before 9 March. Her crew were rescued by Freeman Denis (United States). Alexander was on a voyage from New York, United States to Hamburg.
Bellesisle	France	The ship sank. She was on a voyage from Marseille, Bouches-du-Rhône to Great Yarmouth, Norfolk, United Kingdom.
Clyde	United Kingdom	The steamship was driven ashore at Mazagan, Morocco before 23 March. She was refloated and sailed for London.
Confidenza	Flag unknown	The ship was wrecked at Kavala, Greece.
Eliza	Sweden	The ship was wrecked on the Colorados, off the coast of Cuba before 9 March.
Eliza Caroline	United Kingdom	The barque was driven ashore at Great Yarmouth, Norfolk. She was refloated and taken in to Harwich, Essex in a waterlogged condition.
Gedda	Flag unknown	The ship was wrecked. She was on a voyage from Trieste to Bahia, Brazil.
Grimes	Norway	The ship foundered in the English Channel off the coast of Calvados, France with the loss of at least four lives.
Joaquina	Spain	The ship was wrecked near Santander. She was on a voyage from Santander to Havana, Cuba.
Lindean	United Kingdom	The ship was abandoned in the North Sea. Her crew were rescued. She was on a voyage from South Shields, County Durham to Callao, Peru.
Lochee	United Kingdom	The ship was driven ashore at Cojímar, Cuba.
Madeira	Flag unknown	The barque was wrecked on the Pratas Shoals. She was on a voyage from Hong Kong to Yokohama, Japan.
Neptune	United Kingdom	The ship was wrecked at Stavanger, Norway.
Sofia	Spain	The ship was wrecked near Vigo before 22 March.
North America	United Kingdom	The ship ran aground at Lisbon Portugal and was consequently beached at Belém, Portugal. She was on a voyage from Batavia, Netherlands East Indies to Rotterdam, South Holland, Netherlands.
Nostra Señora del Rosario	Spain	The ship was wrecked on "Consigliero Island".
Pelican	United Kingdom	The ship was lost at "Snedia", Ottoman Syria.
Princess of Wales	United Kingdom	The ship was driven ashore at Bahia Honda, Cuba. She was on a voyage from Minatitlan, Mexico to Queenstown, County Cork.
Teutonia	Prussia	The ship was wrecked on the west coast of Sweden. She was on a voyage from Charlestown, Cornwall, United Kingdom to Kiel.
Thomas Dunham	United Kingdom	The ship was driven ashore at New York. She was on a voyage from Liverpool, Lancashire to New York.
Thornton	United Kingdom	The ship was wrecked near Damietta, Egypt with the loss of seven of her crew. She was on a voyage from South Shields to Alexandria, Egypt.
Vabella	Norway	The schooner foundered in the North Sea with the loss of all hands on or before 15 March. She was on a voyage from Fraserburgh, Aberdeenshire, United Kingdom to Mandal.
Valkyrien	United Kingdom	The ship was driven ashore at "Bussorah", Basra Vilayet. She was on a voyage from Sunderland, County Durham to Bussorah.
Wave	(United Kingdom of Great Britain and Ireland) Jersey	The cutter was wrecked on the French coast in late March with the loss of all seven crew.
Wyvern	United States	The ship was wrecked on the Great Bahama Bank before 15 March. She was on a voyage from Jamaica to Falmouth, Massachusetts.
