= Bagalow Quarry =

Disused quarry in Cornwall, England

- Interactive map of Bagalow Quarry
- Location: 50.653°N 4.760°W
- Products: Slate
- Opened: 1830s

Bagalow Quarry is a disused slate quarry between Tintagel and Trebarwith at Bagalow Cove on the north coast of Cornwall, South West England. The quarry was worked from the 1830s into the early part of the twentieth century.

== Location ==
The quarry site cuts a sharp right angle into the cliffs above Bagalow Cove immediately due south of Dria Quarry. The near vertical cliffs of the cove are almost entirely the work of quarrying.

== Stone ==
The quarry provided a source of Upper Devonian slate and Lower Carboniferous slates of a greyish green colour used predominantly for roofing.

== History ==
Bagalow quarry was established by local man, Edgar Jeffrays in 1834. Jeffrays also dug another quarry at the top of Sanding Road, the road used by donkeys carrying sand up from Trebarwith Strand for agricultural use. In order to work the cliffs, "strongpoints" were built on the cliff edge, and men were lowered down on ropes to work the rock face. The pulleys were operated by whims powered by donkeys or horses.

== Industrial remains ==
A relatively intact horse whim remains at the far northeastern corner of the cliff face. The structure is built using the herringbone technique common in Cornish hedges. Also present is the hollow where the whim's central bearing stone will have sat. Nearby are the remains of a stone feed store for the animals which operated the whim.
