= Lambshouse and Gull Point Quarry =

Two disused slate quarries in Cornwall, England

Lambshouse and Gull Point Quarries
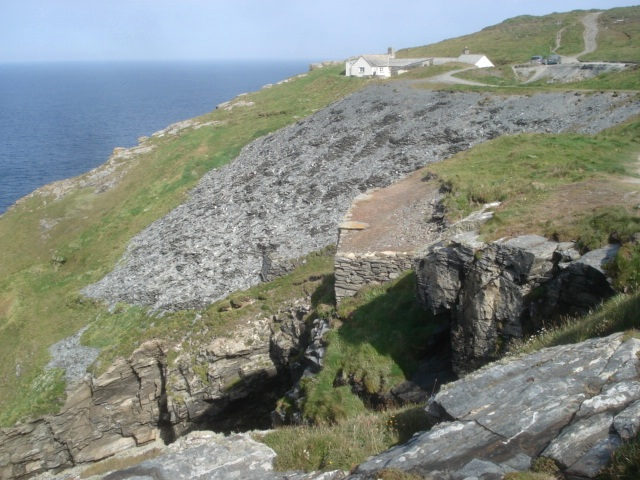
- Coordinates: 50.658°N 4.764°W

Lambshouse and Gull Point Quarries are two disused slate quarries between Tintagel and Trebarwith at Lambshouse Cove on the north coast of Cornwall, South West England. The quarries were latterly worked jointly as one site and were abandoned by the turn of the 20th century. It is likely that Lambshouse Quarry originated at the cliffs at the north of the cove while Gull Point was to the south.

== Location ==
The quarry site cuts a deep "D" shape into the cliffs immediately due south of the Tintagel youth hostel building and is known as Lambshouse Cove. The near vertical cliffs around the cove are almost entirely artificial and the workings of drills can be seen in the rock wall. The quarries are just south of Long Grass Quarry and just north of Dria Quarry.

== Stone ==
The quarry provided a source of Upper Devonian slate and Lower Carboniferous slates of a greyish green colour used predominantly for roofing. A "box cave" at sea level produced a darker green slate considered to be of higher quality.

== History ==
The quarries along this coastal stretch possibly date back to the 17th century. By 1896, Lambshouse Quarry employed 38 workers - 33 indoors and 5 outdoors. At the time, the site was operated by Harveys of Hayle. It was still operational in 1907. According to OS maps, Gull Point was still in use in 1884 but had been abandoned by 1907.

== Industrial remains ==
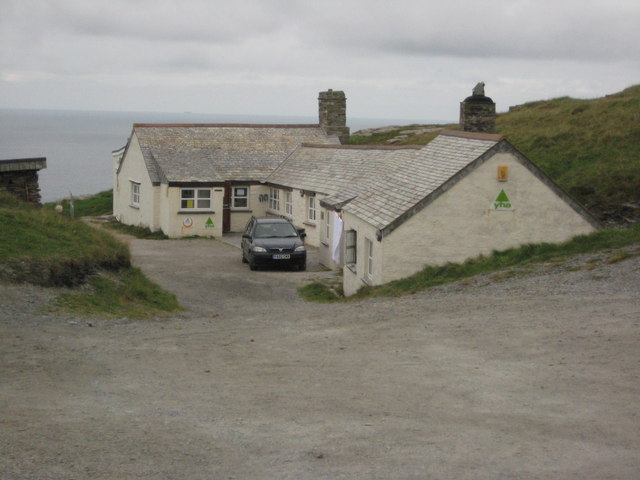
Repurposed offices and sheds for Lambshouse Quarry

Lambshouse and Gull Point quarries have some of the best preserved remains of all the quarries along this coast. There is a cluster of three horse or donkey whims where stone was hauled up in buckets at the end of ropes. The best preserved of these which served Gull Point quarry still has its intact mechanism pit and cable tunnels. One of the most striking features of Lambshouse Quarry is the giant spoil tip cascading down the cliffs to the sea. Just to the north of this is the current youth hostel building. This originally housed the office, powerhouse and smithy for the quarry and dates back to at least 1884. The youth hostel doubled for the coastguard station in the 1981 BBC serial The Nightmare Man.
