= Long Grass Quarry =

Disused slate quarry

Long Grass Slate Quarry
- Coordinates: 50.660°N 4.764°W

Long Grass Quarry (also known as Cliff Quarry) is a small, disused slate quarry between Tintagel and Trebarwith on the north coast of Cornwall, South West England, which was worked up until 1937. It was the last of the slate quarries on this stretch of coast to be abandoned.

== Location ==
The quarry site occupies the stretch of coastline immediately north west of the Tintagel youth hostel and just to the south of the abandoned Gillow Slate Quarry. The quarry workings extend for around 70m in length and reach a height of 59m.

== Quarrying ==
Men would use flights of wooden ladders to climb down the sheer rock face to the left of a small "box cave" that had been tunnelled at the foot of the cliff. Quarrying here was hazardous: in 1886, three workers lost their lives when the rock they were drilling fell into the sea and a quarryman named Reuben Tinney died in 1936 shortly before the quarry closed.

== Industrial remains ==
The youth hostel building is associated with nearby Lambshouse Quarry where it served as offices, powerhouse and smithy. The remains of a strip of ten small buildings can still be seen; these were possibly sheds where slate was dressed. There are possibly ruins of some splitting sheds at the extreme south of the quarry which were destroyed as the quarry expanded some time after 1907. Remains of iron handrails, chains and rusty stanchions in the cliff face are evidence of aids for the men climbing down the cliffs on ladders.

== Stone ==
The quarry provided a source of Upper Devonian slate and Lower Carboniferous slates of a greyish green colour used predominantly for roofing. Slate from inside the box cave provided exceptionally good quality slate.

== History ==
The quarries on this stretch of coast possibly date back to the 17th century and Long Grass remained operational until 1937. It features as a site on the 1884 OS map and was expanded considerably between 1907 and 1937. During this time, many of the earlier quarry buildings were destroyed. An archaeological survey conducted by the Cornwall Archaeological Unit in 1990 recorded traces of splitting huts and a tramway, as well as ruins of a small 20th-century concrete structure. By the time the quarry closed in 1937, it will have been used for little more than extraction and dressing stone.

== Charles Hambly ==
Hambly was a "rockman" at Long Grass Quarry- one of the workers suspended by rope against the rock face. On 20 December 1893, Hambly led a party of four men in the rescue of eleven crew from the Italian barque, Iota. The ship had struck a nearby pinnacle known as Lye Rock. Coastguards scaled Lye Rock and Hambly was lowered down the rock face on a rope. Despite strong gusts of wind and hail, he secured ropes to seven of Iota's crew who were then brought to the mainland by breeches buoy. For his efforts, Hambly was awarded the Testimonial on Vellum as well as the Italian Silver Medal for Bravery.

Hambly was also responsible for rescuing some of the crew of the wrecked French ship Gazelle in April 1899. For this he received the French Silver Medal for Bravery. In the early days of the Royal Society for the Protection of Birds Hambly was a correspondent for the Society.
