= Gillow Slate Quarry =

Disused slate quarry in Cornwall, England

- Coordinates: 50.664°N 4.761°W

Production
- Type: Stone

Gillow State Quarry is a small, disused slate quarry between Tintagel and Trebarwith on the north coast of Cornwall, South West England. The quarry was abandoned by the turn of the 20th century.

== Location ==
The quarry site is at the foot of a steep coastal slope just north of St Materiana's Church in Tintagel and just to the west of the South West Coast Path. The quarry workings extend from sea level around 40m to the top of the cliff. The terracing where the slate has been worked can still be seen, as well as some platforms for whims and the remains of what might have been tool sheds. Gillow Quarry is just north of Long Grass Quarry and is the northernmost of the quarries that lie between Tintagel and Trebarwith.

== Stone ==
The quarry provided a source of Upper Devonian slate and Lower Carboniferous slates of a greyish green colour used predominantly for roofing.

== History ==
The quarry possibly dates back to the 17th century. It was still operational in 1884 but by 1896 it was no longer listed on OS maps. The 1907 OS map lists the quarry as "disused".
