= Penhallick Wharf =

Coordinates: 50.654°N 4.765°W

Penhallick Wharf is a disused coastal loading dock between Tintagel Castle and Trebarwith Strand on the north coast of Cornwall in South West England. The wharf served the Tintagel Slate Quarries, particularly those without easy access to the loading beach at Tintagel Haven. These include Caroline, Dria, Bagalow and possibly Lambshouse and Gull Point quarries.

With no harbours between Boscastle 3.6 miles (5.8 km) to the north and Port Gaverne 6.3 m (10 km) to the south, there was a shortage of landing points on this stretch of coastline. Before the railway reached Camelford and Delabole in the 1890s, the only way for slate to be transported was by sea.

== Location ==
The wharf consisted of a revetted stone platform on the south side of Penhallick Point, just north of Dria quarry. It was accessed by a zigzag trackway that can still be seen from the South West Coast Path above Dria Cove.

== History ==
The wharf predates the 1890s arrival of the railway and was already incomplete by 1884. The 1907 OS map shows a projecting wharf made from revetted stone, but which had already fallen into disuse. The projecting stone wharf stood 115ft (35 m) above the sea but has since completely disappeared.

== Use as a loading wharf ==
There are remains of a plinth on which slate was stored prior to shipping. Penhallick will most likely have had a loading crane, which would have winched slate onto ships berthed alongside the wharf.
