= Penhellick =

Settlement in Cornwall

Penhellick is the name of two settlements in Cornwall, England, UK. One is in the parish of Camborne and the other in the parish of St Wenn. The meaning of the name is "hilltop with willows".

There are also two settlements in Cornwall called Penhallick, one in the parish of Carn Brea and the other in the parish of St Keverne. Penhallic Point is a headland near Treknow (owned by the National Trust) and nearby is Penhallick Wharf.

== See also ==
- Alexander Penhellick
