= Iota (Italian ship) =

Nineteenth century shipwreck

Iota was a wooden barque built in Bideford in 1866 and weighing 572 tons. The ship was owned by an Italian firm named Mazella based in Naples and was wrecked near Tintagel, Cornwall, on 20 December 1893.

== The wreck ==
The Iota was en route from Cardiff to Trinidad with a cargo of coal. The ship was driven against Lye Rock in a storm at around 5pm by which time it was already dark. Onlookers at nearby Willapark watched helplessly as mountainous waves pounded the boat.

== The rescue ==
The eleven Italian crew and one boy attempted to either swim to shore or climb from one of the ship's masts to the pinnacle of Lye Rock. One of the sailors tried to help the fourteen-year-old boy, Domenico Catanese to shore but both drowned. Two crew made it onto Lye Rock but it was clear that they would not make it to safety without help. Three local men led by Thomas Brown were joined by a coastguard and once the tide was low enough, they battled wind, waves and darkness to climb Lye Rock. Not understanding any Italian, they reassured the two stricken sailors by grasping their hands. Seven other men were discovered on a ledge lower down the rock and Charles Hambly, a quarryman at nearby Long Grass Quarry was lowered on a rope. All seven sailors were successfully lifted up the cliff and from here, they were taken to the mainland via breeches buoy.

== Aftermath ==
Domenico Catanese was buried in the churchyard of St Materiana's church, although the inscription has his name as Catanese Domenico. For his valour, Charles Hambly was presented with the Testimonial on Vellum.

The story is told in verse in Musings on Tintagel and its Heroes by Joseph Brown, 1897.
