= Bossiney Castle =

Norman motte castle

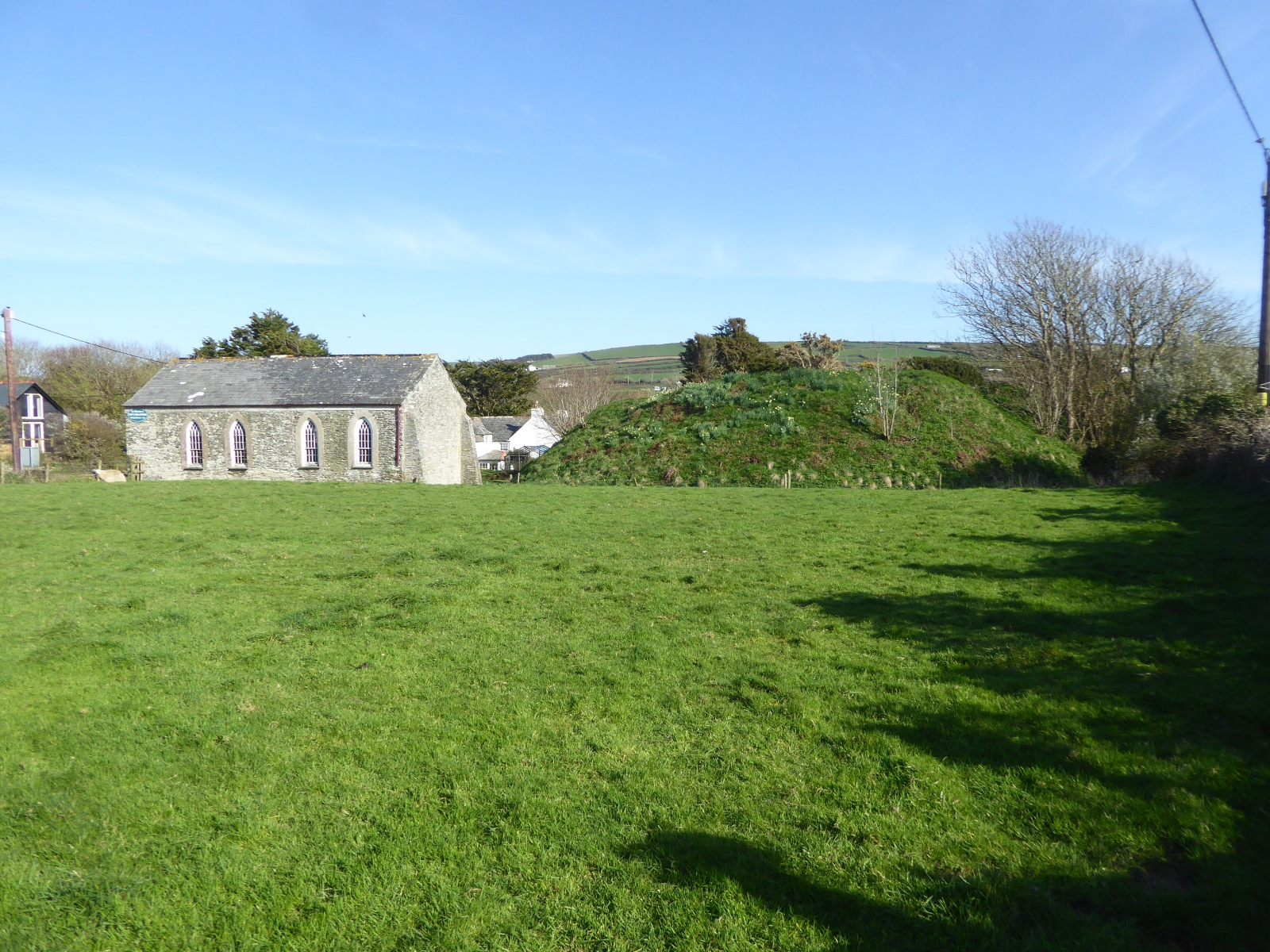
- Interactive map of Bossiney Castle
- 50.66633°N 4.73854°W
- Location: North Cornwall, United Kingdom
- OS grid reference: SX0657088764

Scheduled monument
- Official name: Motte castle known as Bossiney Castle
- Designated: 26 November 1928
- Reference no.: 1006708

Bossiney Castle is a Norman fortification, built in the 11th century, following the Norman invasion of England in 1066. It is in the village of Bossiney, in North Cornwall The remains of the motte are on private land with no public access, but can be viewed from the B3263, lying behind the 19th-century Methodist Chapel.

There are no records of antiquarian or archaeological excavation having been carried out at this site, but it was surveyed in 1852 by Henry MacLauchlan, and subsequently by others. When scheduled as a Historic Monument in 1928 the mound measured 46 metres in diameter, and 5.9 metres high. There remained evidence of a ditch surrounding the motte, in a poor state of preservation, 20 metres in width, and surviving to 0.9 metres in depth.

== History ==
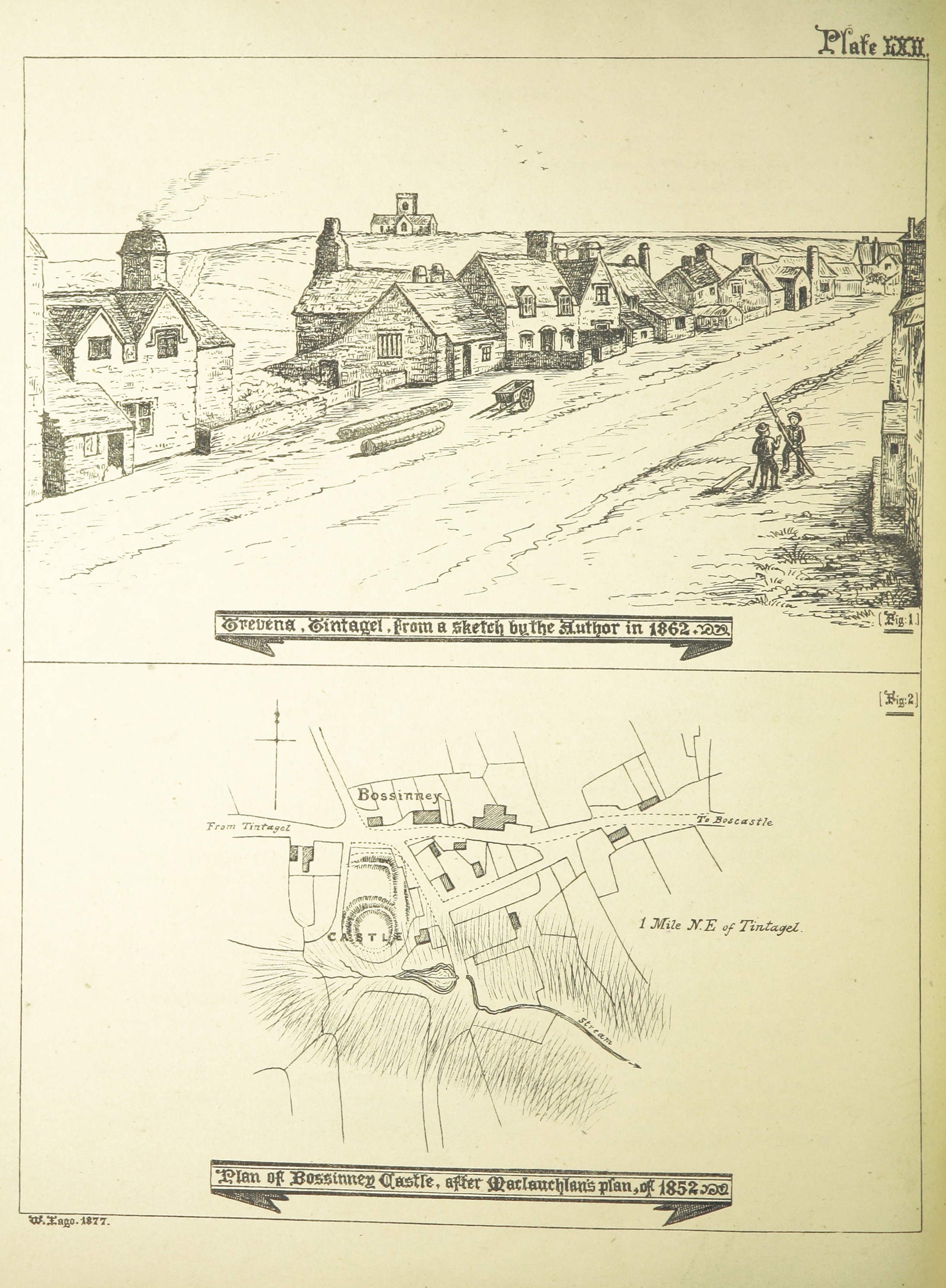
Plan of Bossiney Castle, after Henry MacLauchlan (below)

It is not known who caused the castle to be built, but it is of early Norman design. There is no evidence of a bailey, and thus Bossiney Castle may be a motte castle, an early Norman construction incorporating just a mound and timber fortifications. It has also been described as a 'Timber Castle' in the absence of any masonry at the site.

Its construction is often attributed to Robert, Count of Mortain, who held Bossiney in 1086, but there is currently a lack of archaeological or documentary evidence to support this. It appears to have fallen out of use in the late 13th century when nearby Tintagel Castle was built.

By the 16th century it was named Bossiney Mound, and was the site of the reading of local election results for members of Parliament. It was from the mound, in 1584, that Francis Drake was elected to Parliament for the Borough of Bossiney. This activity ceased in 1832 following the Reform Act, when the borough was abolished.

== Myths ==
Local Cornish tradition links Bossiney Castle with King Arthur. Sabine Baring-Gould mentioned that Arthur's golden round table was buried beneath the mound, to surface again each Midsummers Eve, when lights will be seen in the sky. Another mentioned in Castles4kids.info, is that King Arthur and his knights are asleep under the mound, waiting to rise in England's time of need, though this may be a later addition to the legend, as no mention was made of this by Baring-Gould. It reflects similar European 'King under the Mountain' legends.

== The castle today ==
This monument is scheduled under the Ancient Monuments and Archaeological Areas Act 1979 as amended, by the Secretary of State for Culture, Media and Sport. It is listed under entry number 1006708, and was initially scheduled on 26 November 1928.
