= Lye Cove =

Small coastal inlet

Coordinates: 50.674°N 4.741°W

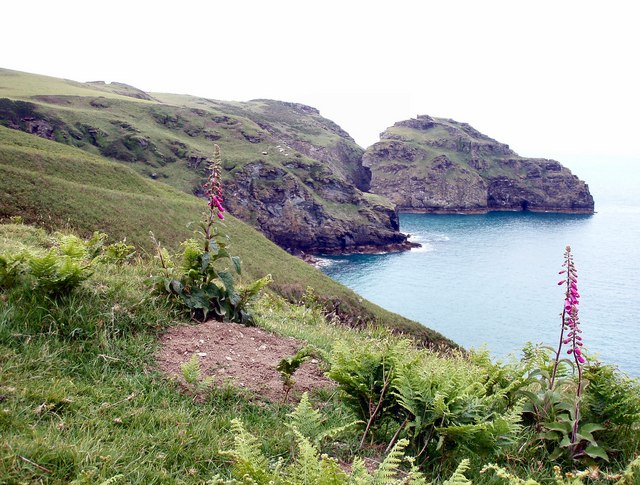
A view of Lye Rock from Bossiney Haven

Lye Cove is a small coastal inlet near Tintagel on the north coast of Cornwall, South West England. The cove lies immediately below the Iron Age hill fort known as Willapark and nearby Lye Rock was the site of the wreck of the Italian cargo ship Iota in 1893. Above the cove is the remains of a nineteenth century lime kiln.

== Wreck of the Iota ==
The Iota was an Italian barque bound for Trinidad from Cardiff with a cargo of Welsh coal. On 20 December 1893, a fierce storm drove the ship onto Lye Rock. A heroic four-man rescue team led by local quarryman, Charles Hambly was able to save eleven of the twelve crew. 14-year-old Domenico Catanese drowned and is buried in nearby St Materiana’s churchyard. The crew were able to get onto the rock and apart from Catanese were saved (the name is given in the official Italian usage, surname first: Catanese Domenico, on a lifebuoy).

== Seabird colony ==
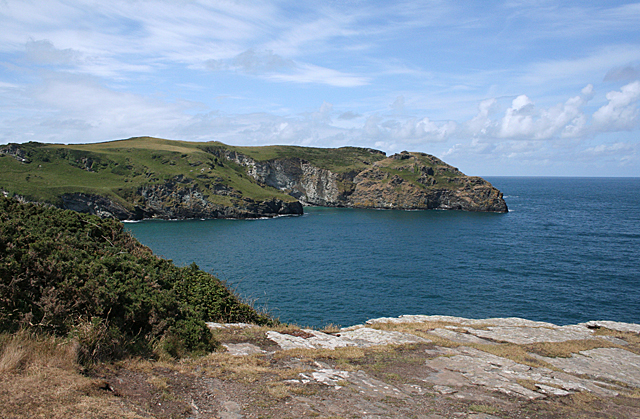
Lye Rock and Willapark

Lye Rock is a breeding site for guillemots, razorbills, fulmars and shags. By 1940, the rock was Cornwall’s third largest breeding colony for puffins though none now remain. Grey seals breed in the sea caves at the foot of the cliffs. These were once culled for their skins and oil. Fishermen would enter the caves with torches at low tide and club the dazzled animals to death.

== Industrial remains ==
Above Lye Cove is a small but well-preserved lime kiln. Lime and sand were used on Tintagel’s acidic soil as fertilisers. Coal and lime will have been landed by ship at nearby Tintagel Haven or Penhallick Wharf and brought to the cliffs above Lye Cove by donkey.
