= Bowithick Quarry =

Disused quarry in England

Bowithick Quarry is a disused nineteenth century open cast slate quarry situated in Trebarwith Valley on the outskirts of Tintagel in Cornwall, South West England. The quarry ceased operations in 1913.

== Location ==
The quarry site lies in Trebarwith valley between the hamlets of Trewarmett and Penpethy and can be accessed from the B3263 road.

== History ==
Bowithick quarry lies at the eastern end of the Prince of Wales Quarry and the two appear to have been worked in tandem. Slate from both quarries was dressed at Bowithick with the finished stone being hauled back across the valley using power from the Woolf Compound beam engine located at the Prince of Wales quarry. The slate travelled across the road by bridges which are no longer standing. There are traces of a steam winding engine house at Bowithick. The quarry ceased operations in around 1913.

== The quarry today ==
The quarry is now mostly obscured by a landfill site.
