= Bossiney Haven =

Cove in Cornwall, England

- Cove
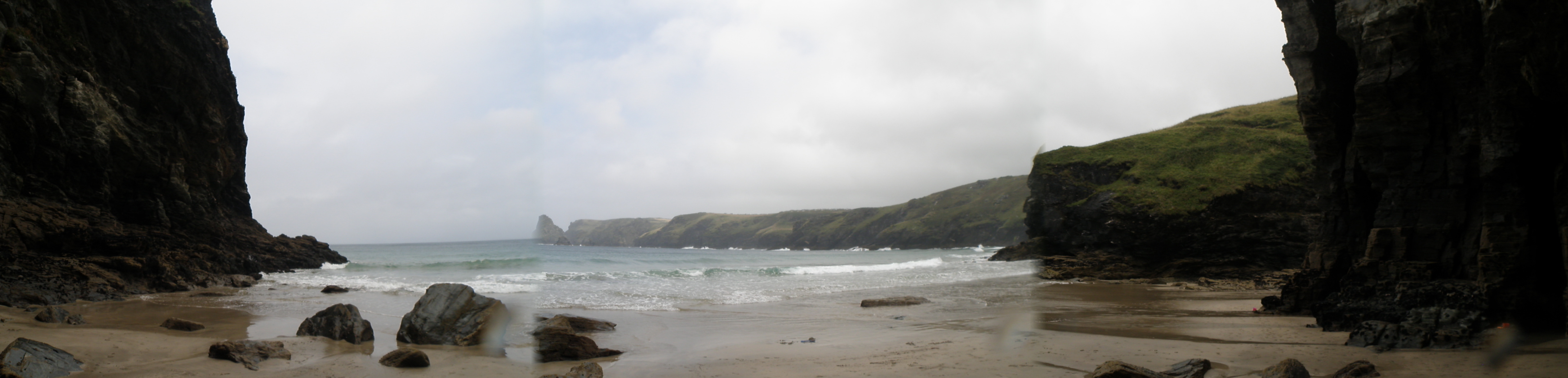
- Panorama of Bossiney Haven on a wet day

- Location in Cornwall
- Coordinates: 50.671°N 4.735°W
- Location: Cornwall, UK

Bossiney Haven (Cornish: Porth Boskyny, meaning cove at Bossiney) is a small cove in the civil parish of Tintagel. It is on the north coast of Cornwall, United Kingdom and a mile east of Tintagel and three miles west of Boscastle. The South West Coast Path closely follows the coast above the cove.

Bossiney Haven is part of the Tintagel Cliffs Site of Special Scientific Interest (SSSI) designated for its geological and wildlife interests. The cove is at the northern point of the Tintagel Geological Conservation Review site, chosen because it is a good example of a longitudinal coast, and for its hard rock coastal landforms. The cove is open to northerly winds off the Atlantic and is flanked by the Iron Age cliff castle of Willapark to the north. At low tide it is linked to Benoath Cove.

An unusual part of the cliff is known as the Elephant Rock, where a high vertical arch has formed almost separating a ″narrow trunk of rock from the mainland″. This feature shows the relationship of vertical jointing to cliff features. The cove has a sandy beach which is completely covered by the tide at high water

At the right hand side of the cove there is a cave that is about 60 feet in height at the entrance but only 15–20 wide. It opens up into a large cavern with two more caverns which become very dark. The cave continues after this point but the floor becomes rock and very uneven. It has been said there is a waterfall in the cave.

Access to the beach is by steep steps, a route which is not suitable for wheelchairs or push chairs. There is no lifeguard coverage.
