= The Prince of Wales Quarry =

Disused slate quarry in Cornwall, England

The Prince of Wales Quarry is a disused open cast slate quarry in Trebarwith Valley on the outskirts of Tintagel in Cornwall, South West England. The quarry is known for its engine house, the only one of its kind in North Cornwall.

== History ==
The quarry was opened in 1871 but closed during the 1890s. It has now fallen into disrepair. The engine house was built in 1870 and is believed to have remained in operation until nearby Bowithick Quarry closed down in 1913. It was restored in 1976. The quarry pit is now flooded creating a small lake.

== The Engine House ==
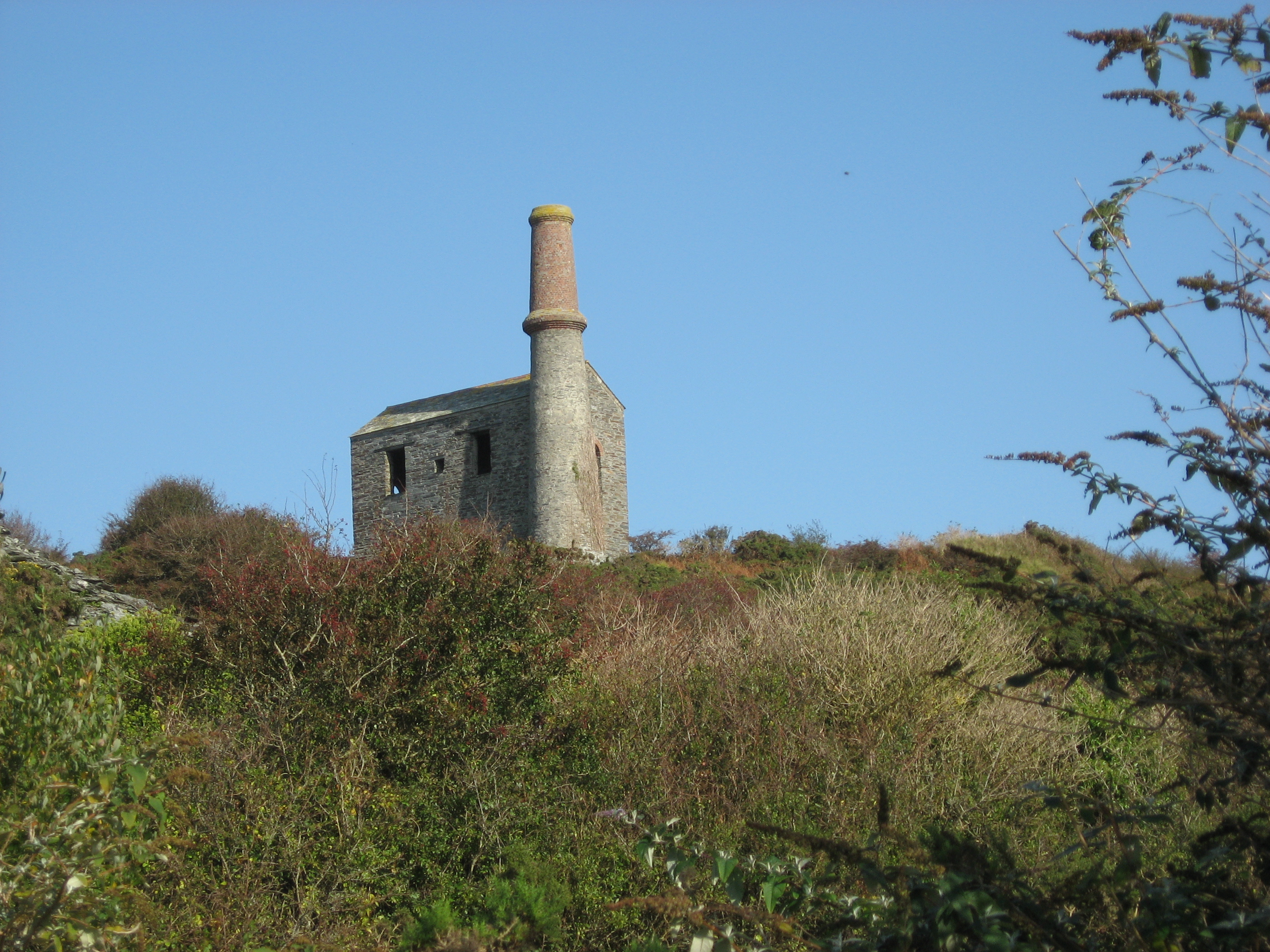
Engine House, Prince of Wales Quarry in 2008

The dominant feature of the quarry is its stone engine house. Built in 1870, this served a dual purpose of pumping and winding. The engine house was built to accommodate a 50" Woolf Compound beam engine which pumped the large pit below and hauled large blocks of slate from the depths of the quarry workings to the headframe where it was sorted ready for splitting. The engine also hauled trucks across bridges from Bowthick quarry on the other side of the valley. At the time it was installed, the engine cost £1590-4s-0d.

== The Stone ==
The quarry produced a bluish coloured slate from the Upper Devonian Penpethy Beds and was used predominantly for roofing.

== The Quarry today ==
The slate tips have now been colonised by wildflowers. These include wild honeysuckle, gorse, foxgloves and heather. There are also large elder trees as well as blackberries and sloes. The quarry pit is flooded and a small waterfall flows into it. The whole of this site is now part of a nature reserve with paths and steps leading to the various features as well as a series of panoramic views across the site. The quarry is also used for accommodation run by a company called Kudhva.
