= Hole Beach =

Beach in Cornwall, England

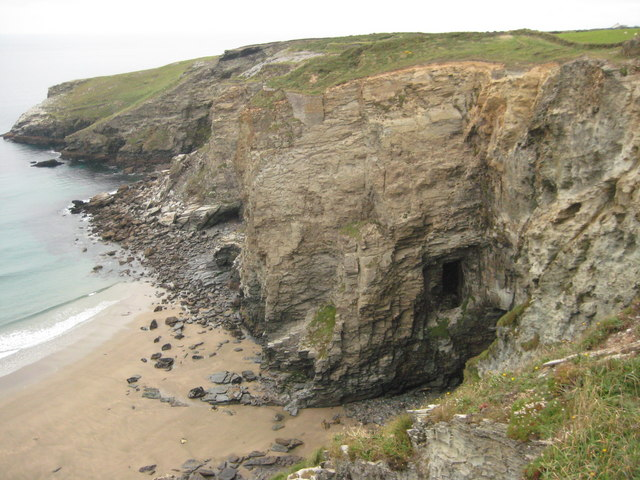
Hole Beach

Hole Beach is a bathing and surf beach just north of Trebarwith Strand on the North Coast of Cornwall, South West England. The beach can be accessed from Trebarwith at low tide or by a zigzagging quarryman's track from the village of Treknow. The beach is sandy and the water is good for surfing. The sheer cliffs to the north of the beach form part of the now disused Caroline Slate Quarry and were created by quarrymen suspended by ropes attached to strongpoints some 75m on the clifftop above. A cave 15m above sea level is artificial and is also the result of quarrying—this is the "hole" that gives the beach its name. There is also a natural sea cave at the rear of the beach. One of the stone strong points still perches on top of the near-vertical cliffs 75m above the beach, as does a second building which was possibly used as a toolshed.
