= Josiah Johnson (pilot boat) =

New York Pilot boat

History

United States
- Name: Josiah Johnson
- Namesake: Josiah Johnson
- Owner: Josiah Johnson
- Operator: J. R. Allcock, Isaac Campbell, William Caroll, and William Qualey
- In service: Early 1840s
- Out of service: March 6, 1869
- Home port: New York
- Fate: Sank

General characteristics
- Propulsion: schooner sail
- Sail plan: Schooner-rigged

The Josiah Johnson was a 19th-century Sandy Hook pilot boat built in the early 1840s by Sandy Hook pilot Josiah Johnson. She was named after the builder. The Josiah Johnson was struck down by the schooner Wanata off of Barnegat and sank in 1869. This resulted in a collision case to recover damages that went to the district court. The court found that the Wanata was at fault for not keeping a lookout.

== Construction and service ==
The New York pilot boat Josiah Johnson, No. 23, was built by Sandy Hook pilot Captain Josiah Johnson (1795–1871), who named the new pilot boat after himself. In 1843, Johnson came to Brooklyn with his nephew, Josiah Johnson Jr. (1832–1919), who became a successful Sandy Hook pilot.

In 1864, the pilot-boat Josiah Johnson, No. 23, while coming through The Narrows, was run into by the Hamburg steamship Germania. The Johnson received damages to her rigging.

On March 23, 1868, the pilot-boat Josiah Johnson, No. 23 returned from a north-east gale, along with other pilot boats, and anchored in the lower New York Bay.

== End of service ==
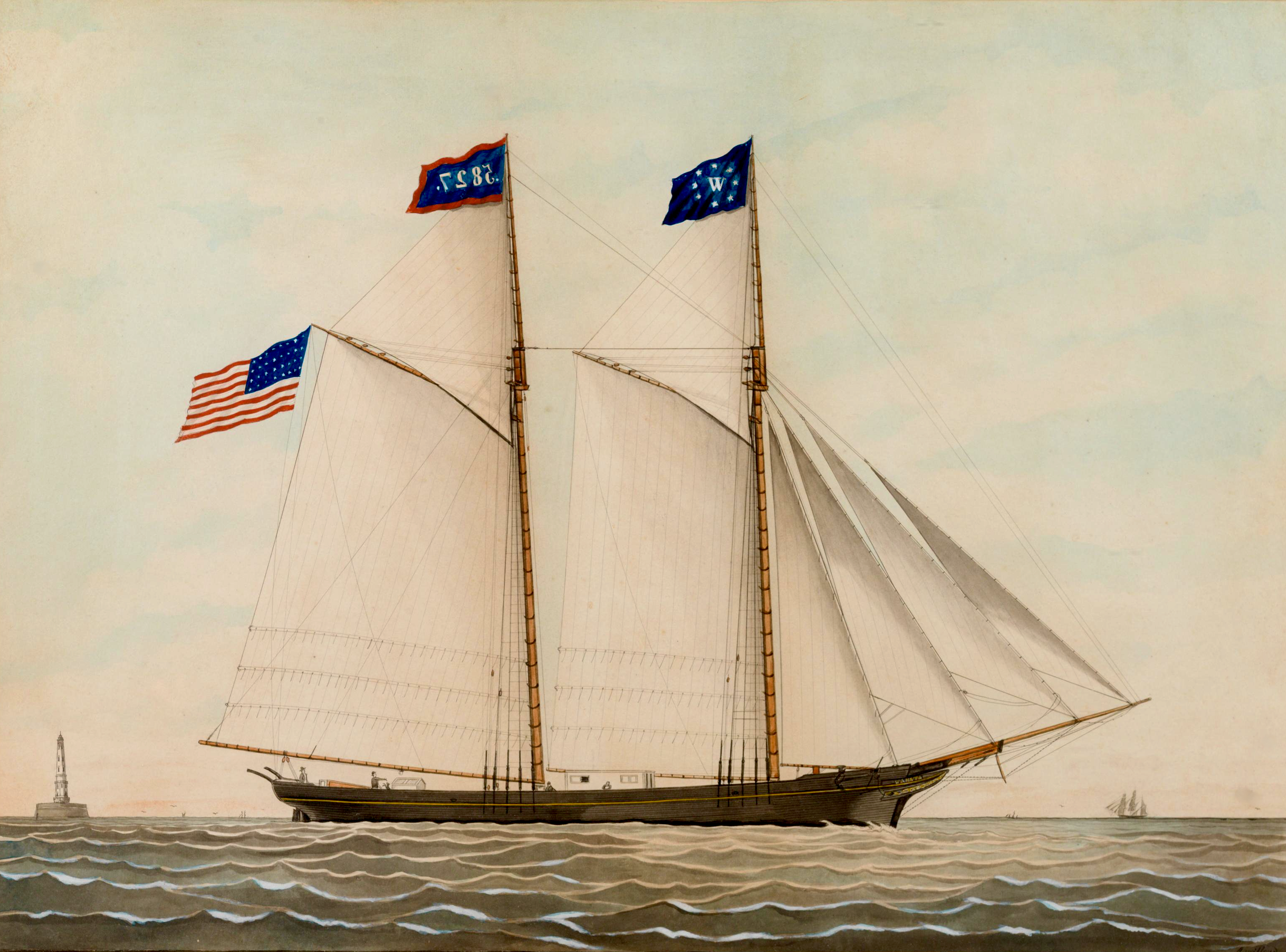
Schooner Wanata, c. 1860–1875

On March 6, 1869, the pilot-boat Josiah Johnson, No. 23 was struck by the schooner Wanata while anchored fifteen miles north of Barnegat Light, New Jersey. The accident happened at night when the wind was strong and the Wanata's lights had blown out. The Johnson sank in ten minutes. Captain Hawkins of the schooner was able to bring the crew of the pilot-boat on board and bring them back to the port of New York. There were thirteen persons on board including six pilots. The pilots on the boat were: J. R. Allcock, Isaac Campbell, William Caroll, and William Qualey.

On March 10, 1869, the pilot boat Mary and Catherine took the place of the Josiah Johnson which was lost in the collision with the schooner Wanata. The crew of the Johnson were transferred to the Mary & Catherine.

In October 1870, the collision with the Wanata went to the New York District Court as Case No. 17,138, to recover $23,000 in damages caused by the schooner Wanata. The outcome was that the schooner was at fault in not keeping a lookout, which contributed to the collision.

== See also ==
- List of Northeastern U. S. Pilot Boats
