= Trebarwith Strand =

Section of coastline in Northern Cornwall, UK

Coordinates: 50.6447°N 4.7618°W

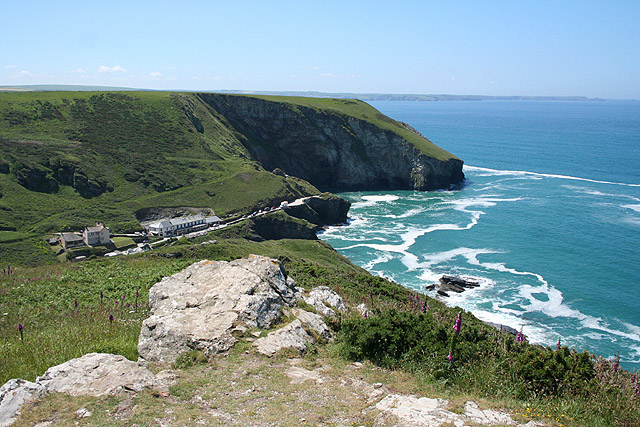
- Above Trebarwith Strand looking towards Dennis Point with the Port William inn, centre left. In the distance the coastline runs out to Port Quin Bay and Rumps Point
- Civil parish: Tintagel
- Unitary authority: Cornwall
- Ceremonial county: Cornwall
- Region: South West
- Country: England
- Sovereign state: United Kingdom
- Post town: TINTAGEL
- Postcode district: PL34
- Police: Devon and Cornwall
- Fire: Cornwall
- Ambulance: South Western

Trebarwith Strand (Cornish: Trebervedh Sian; locally sometimes shortened to The Strand) is a section of coastline located near the coastal settlement of Trebarwith on the north coast of Cornwall, England, UK, 2 1/2 miles (4.0 km) south of Tintagel. It has 800m of sandy beach contained by cliffs in which natural caves are found. The beach can only be accessed at low tide. The strand was once used to land ships to export slate from the nearby quarries while sand from the beach was used for agricultural purposes. The view from the beach is dominated by rocks 300m offshore known as Gull Rock or Otterham Rocks.

== History ==
The name Trebarwith was first associated with the village on the higher ground to the south of the valley which is the most southerly part of Tintagel parish. Land at Trebarwith is first mentioned in records of 1284 and was held from 1329 until the early 16th century by the Lercedekne family. Trebarwith Farm is a Grade II listed building. The road along the valley from Penpethy to the Strand is known as the Sanding Road and was originally built c. 1825 to allow the collection of sand. The local soil is acidic and so sand and lime were fed into it. The sand was loaded into sacks and carried up the hill by donkeys and ponies. A large pool that can be accessed at low tide is known as the horses' pool as this is where the animals cooled off on hot days.

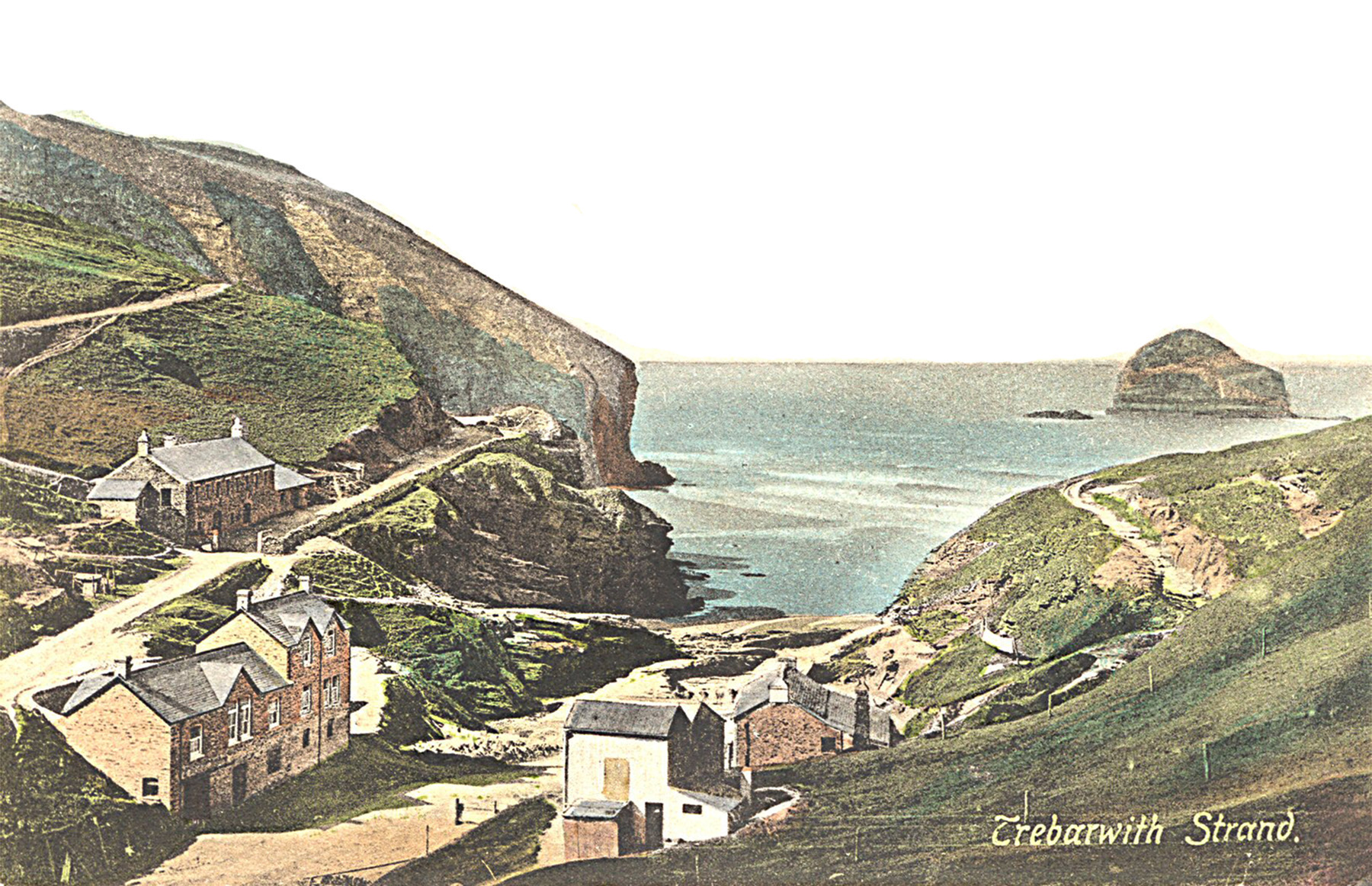
Trebarwith Strand c. 1920

Trebarwith Strand was central to Tintagel's slate industry. Quarrying has taken place here since the fifteenth century and around eight disused quarries scar the coast between the beach and Tintagel Castle. There are also quarries lining the Sanding Road as it climbs up from the beach. Ships brought coal to Port William at the southern end of the beach where cranes and derricks would winch slate down the cliff to be taken away for export.

At Lill Cove a small water-powered copper mine led up from the beach to the cliffs above Trebarwith, though the tunnels at the beach end have now been blocked by rock falls.

A wide "road" has been cut through the rocks at the top of the beach to allow access for the donkeys and ponies bringing sand to the settlements inland.

In the 19th century, a hotel was built close to the access point to the beach. The building is now gift shops and holiday apartments. At some point in the 1970s, the hotel stable block was converted into a pub now called the Port William.

In October 1886, the barque Sarah Anderson was wrecked off Gull Rock with the loss of all on board.

In February 2015, a man was swept out to sea while scattering his sister's ashes at the beach.

== Natural history ==
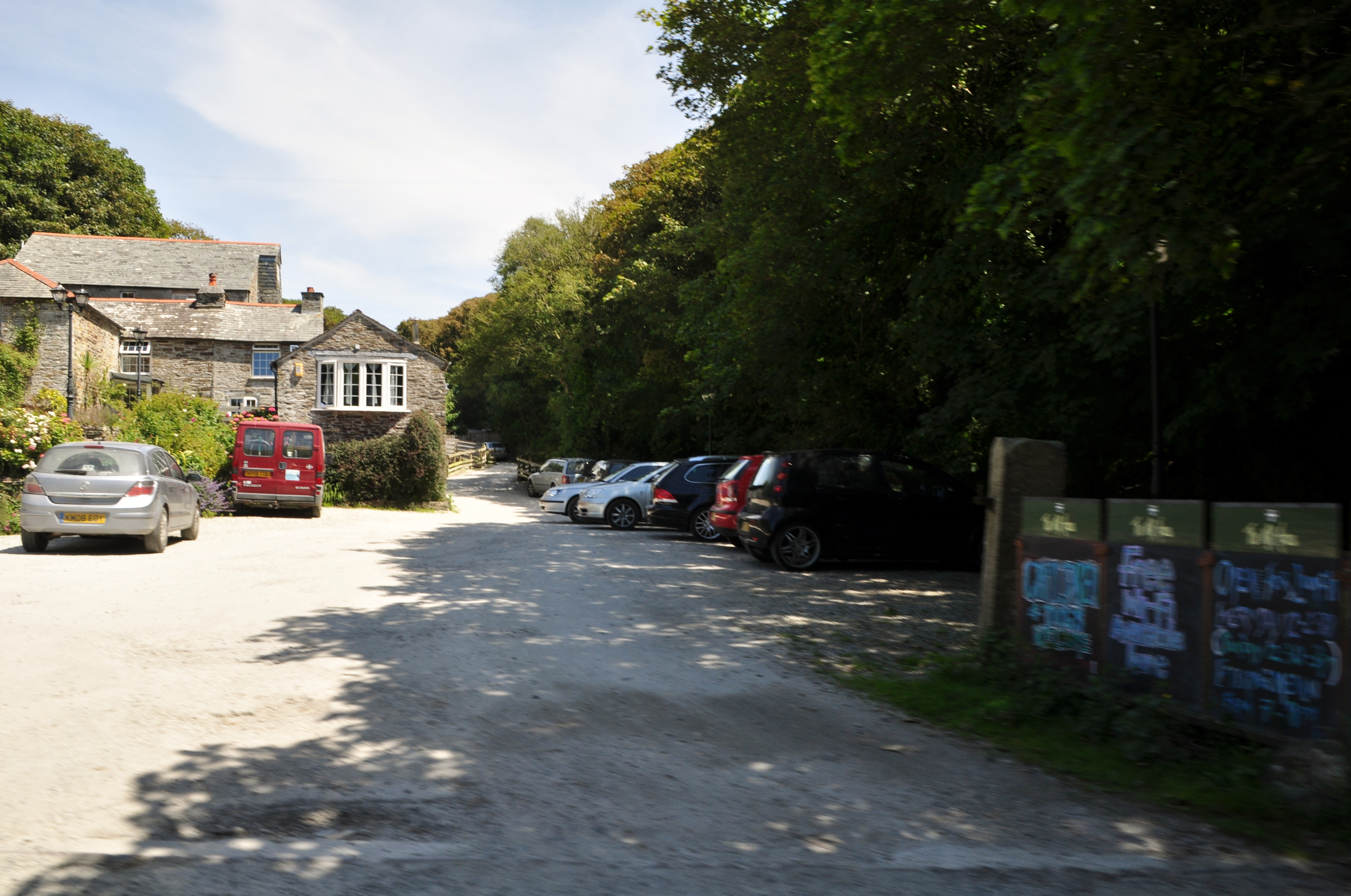
The Mill House Inn

When the tide is at its lowest the sea recedes 300 yards (270 m) and an expanse of sand in excess of 1/2 mile (800 m) wide is uncovered. The rockpools at the base of the cliffs create perfect places for small fish and crabs to hide until the tide turns, and there is an abundance of small molluscs such as periwinkles, barnacles, limpets and mussels clinging in clusters to the rocks.

A small unnamed stream flows into the sea at Trebarwith Strand. About a mile upstream there was a corn mill powered by a water wheel. The building is now a pub called the Mill House Inn.

== Surfing and bathing ==
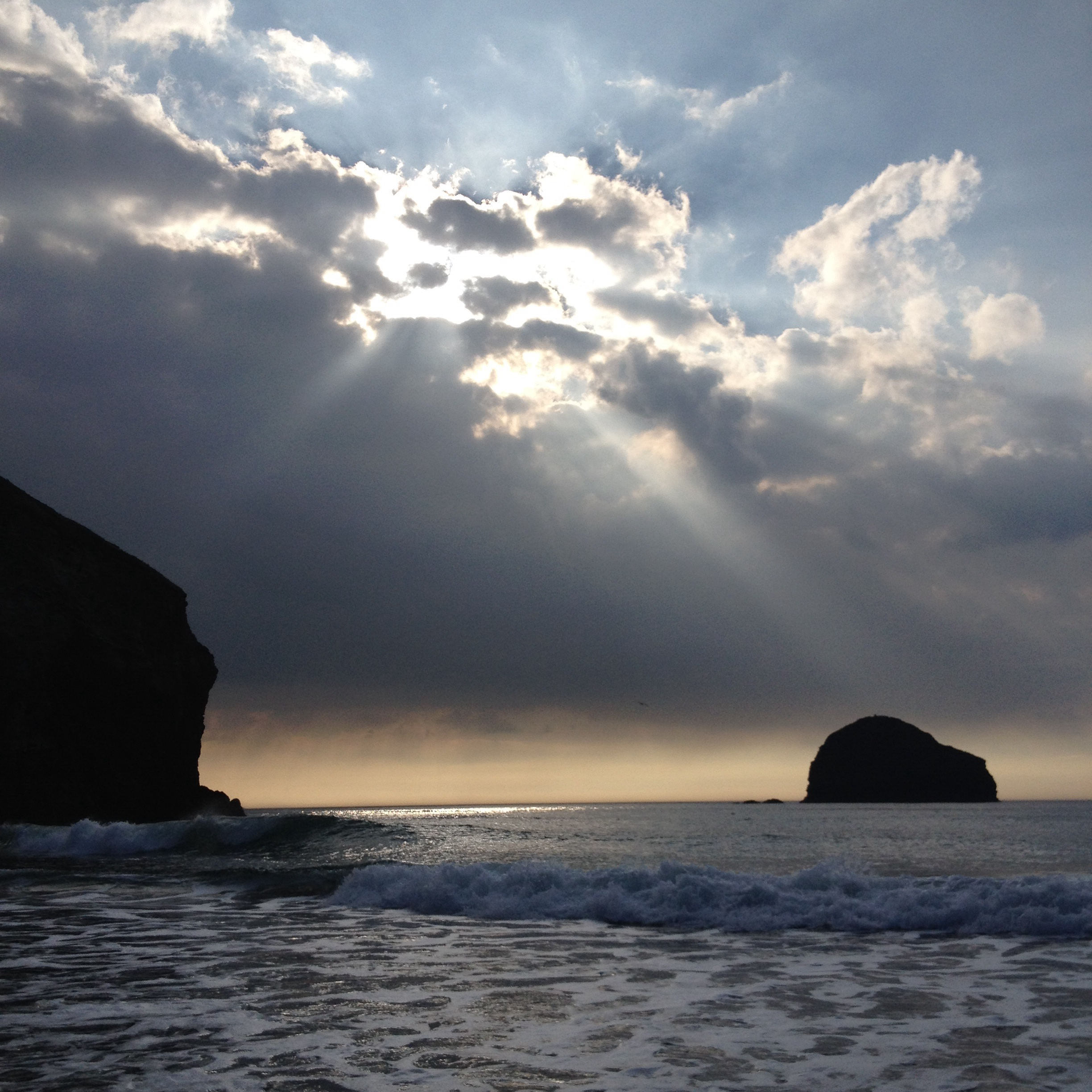
Sea view from the Trebarwith Strand beach in 2014

Frequent strong swells coming in from the Atlantic Ocean make for excellent surfing and the sands are ideal for children, but the state of the tide has a major impact on the beach. As the tide comes in, the sands are swiftly submerged by the incoming seas until all that is left of the beach is the rocks at the base of the cliffs. RNLI provide lifeguards during working hours (9–5). Unwary visitors can easily be cut off by the rising waters with a number of people having to be rescued each year.

== Access by road and path ==
Vehicle access to the beach is via a dead-end lane known as the Sanding Road which runs down a narrow valley from the B3263 Tintagel to Camelford road. From Tintagel, a shortcut is available through the village of Treknow which then joins the Sanding Road. One of the adjacent disused slate quarries has become a glamping site called Kudhva.

Trebarwith Strand is accessible to walkers along the South West Coast Path from both the north and south. The footpath, running through Access Land passes boreholes and other remnants of the cliff quarry workings which were in operation until 1937.

== In popular culture ==
The 1974 film Malachi's Cove or The Seaweed Children based on Anthony Trollope's story and directed by Henry Herbert was filmed largely at Trebarwith. The film starred Donald Pleasence as Malachi.

Trebarwith Strand stood in for Shakespeare’s coast of Illyria in the 1996 production of "Twelfth Night". Gull Rock forms the backdrop for the 1997 film “Oscar and Lucinda” and the 2000 film “Saving Grace."
