= Willapark (Tintagel) =

Iron Age hill fort

Coordinates: 50.574°N 4.743°W

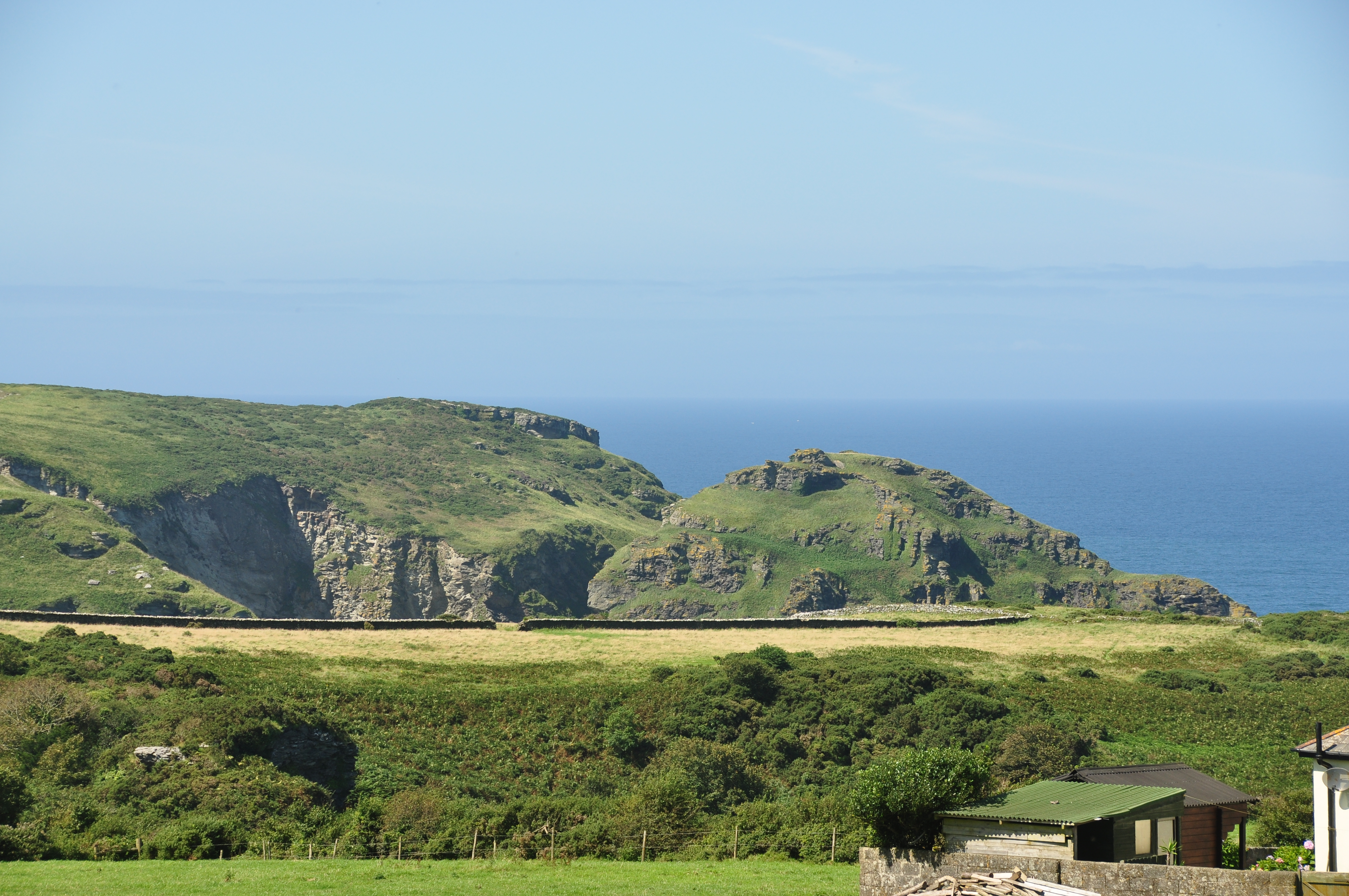
Willapark from Trethevy

Willapark is a headland just north of Tintagel on the north coast of Cornwall, South West England. It is the site of a disputed Iron Age hill fort.

== Hill fort ==
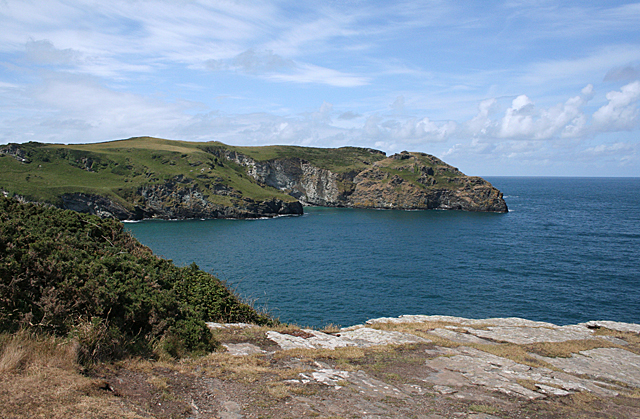
Lye Rock and Willapark

A defensive bank across the headland has led some archaeologists to believe that Willapark was an iron age cliff castle dating from around the first century AD. The name Willapark is Cornish for 'enclosure' and 'lookout'. Given that the promontory has near vertical cliff faces, it will have made a safe place for the local tribes to retreat to in times of attack.

Historians believe that circular marks used to become visible after grass fires, indicating the positions of huts. However, much of the ramparts were removed or adapted to allow quarrying on the headland which is why so little remains today.

An archaeological survey conducted by the National Trust in 2001-02 failed to prove conclusively that Willapark was a hill fort.
