= Whim (mining) =

Mining device

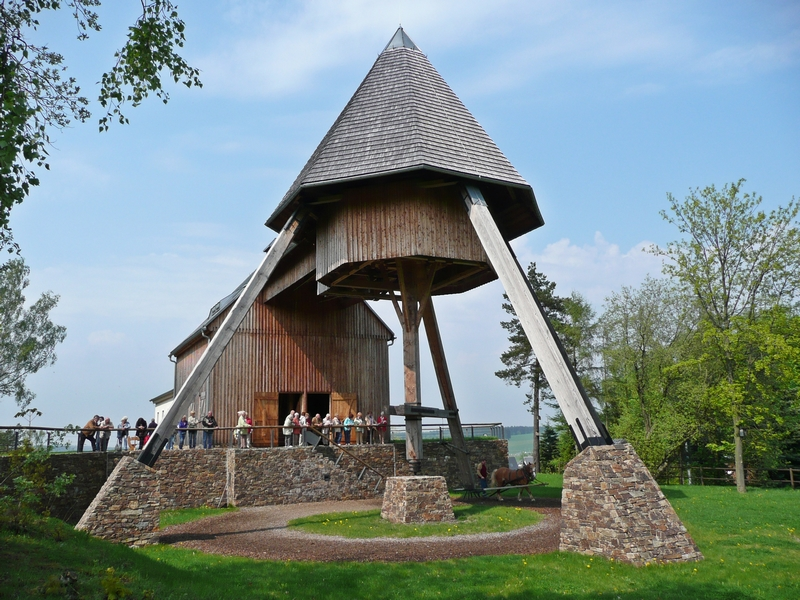
A large horse whim at a historic silver mine in Germany

A whim, also called a whim gin or a horse capstan, is a device similar to a windlass which is used in mining for hauling materials to the surface. It comprises a capstan or a wide drum with a vertical axle. A rope is wound around the drum, with both ends traversing several pulleys and hanging down the mine shaft. As the drum is turned around, one end of the rope is lowered, carrying an empty bucket, while the other one is raised, carrying a full load.

The major benefit of a whim is that its operation can be performed at a distance from the shaft, thus resolving some of the congestion. Early whims were horse-powered, but later they were powered by waterwheels or steam engines, including the most advanced Cornish engines. Whims were used in coal mines until the end of the nineteenth century.

Horse whims were also used to power team boats.

The gin wheel at Nottingham Industrial Museum dating from 1844, is a wooden drum, set on a vertical pole within a wooden frame, with a horizontal shaft from the drum for attaching to a horse. Before joining the other exhibits at Nottingham Industrial Museum, the whim was used at Langton and Pinxton Collieries.
