= Trebarwith =

Hamlet in Cornwall, England

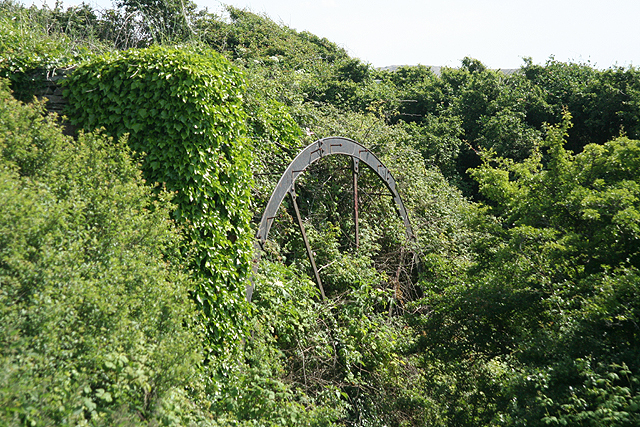
The waterwheel at Trebarwith Farm

Trebarwith (Cornish: Trebervedh, meaning inner farmstead), known locally as Trebarwith Village, is a hamlet in the parish of Tintagel, Cornwall, England, United Kingdom. Trebarwith Strand is on the coast nearby.

Land at Trebarwith is first mentioned in records of 1284 and was held from 1329 until the early 16th century by the Lercedekne family. Trebarwith Farm is a Grade II listed building.
