= Harpole & Foxberrow General Publishers =

1992 novel by J.L. Carr

- Cover of first edition - 1992
- Author: J.L. Carr
- Cover artist: Ian Stephens
- Language: English
- Genre: Comic Fiction
- Publisher: The Quince Tree Press
- Publication date: 1992
- Publication place: United Kingdom
- Media type: Print (Paperback)
- Pages: 157
- ISBN: 978-0-900847-93-6
- OCLC: 27695837
- Preceded by: What Hetty Did

Harpole & Foxberrow General Publishers is the eighth and last novel by J.L. Carr, published in 1992, just after his 80th birthday. The narrator of the story is Hetty Beauchamp, the heroine of What Hetty Did, who describes how George Harpole and Emma Foxberrow (both characters in The Harpole Report) returned from working at a teacher-training college in Sinji, the setting of A Season in Sinji, to establish a small provincial publishing firm.

The book was issued by The Quince Tree Press, established by Carr in 1967 to publish his maps and small books. Carr printed 4,000 copies of the novel at a cost of £5,500 and sold them direct to bookshops at a 40% discount on the cover price of £4.95 or to whoever wrote to him at his house in Kettering asking for a copy. The novel is still available from the Quince Tree Press.
