= The Quince Tree Press =

British imprint

The Quince Tree Press is the imprint established in 1966 by J. L. Carr to publish his maps, pocket books and novels. The Press is now run by his son Robert Carr and his wife, Jane.

== History of the press ==
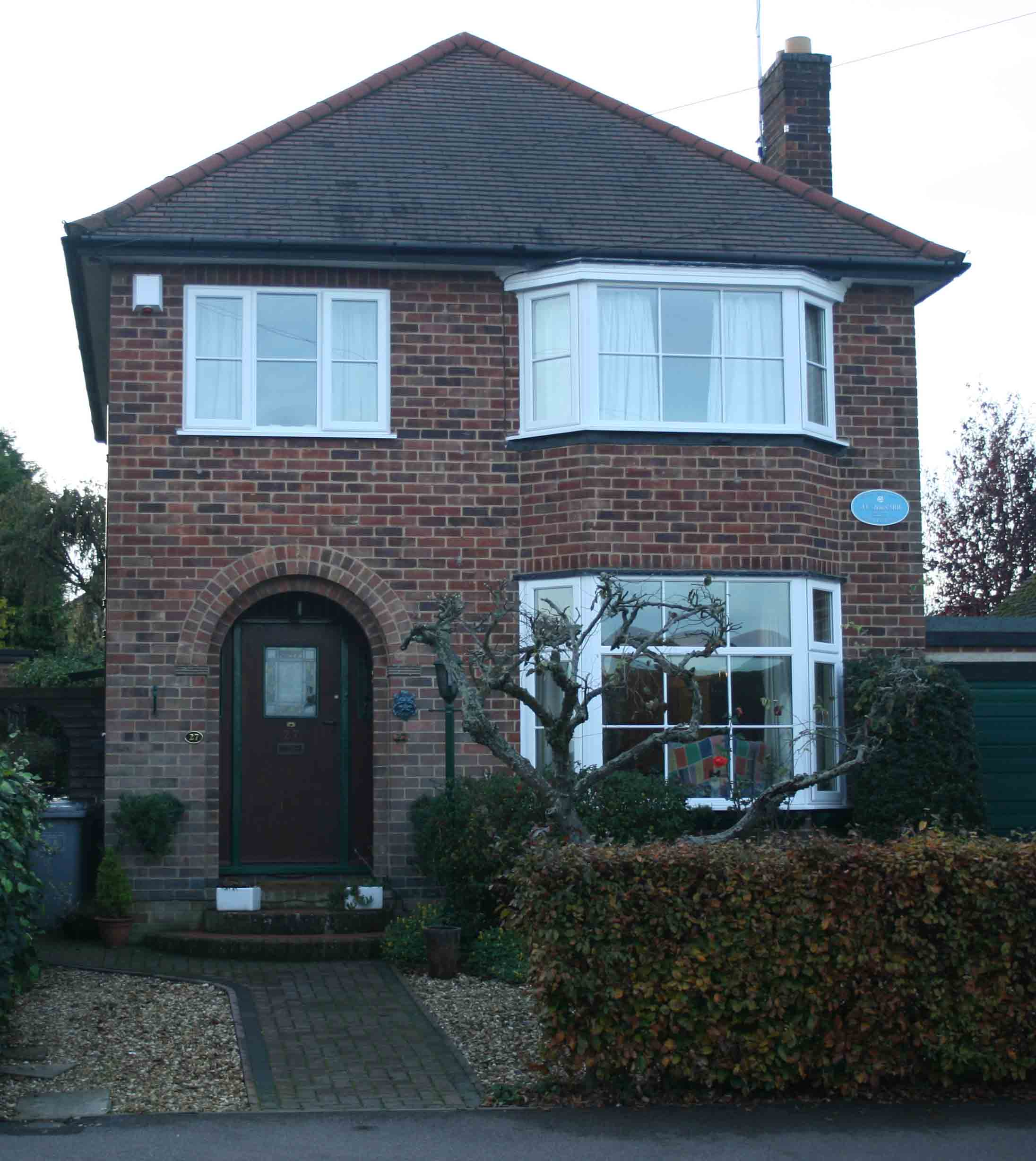
The house in Kettering where J. L. Carr established the Quince Tree Press

When Carr took 2-year leave of absence from teaching in 1967 aged 55 years with savings of £1,600, his aim was to see if he could make his living by selling decorated maps of English counties and small pocket books of poems. These he published from his house at Mill Dale Road in Kettering, Northamptonshire, under the imprint The Quince Tree Press. The quince is a fruiting tree native to the Caucasus and there was one in the front garden of Carr's house.

Carr's maps are of architectural and historical interest rather than being geographical, and give brief details, observations and quotations in a quirky style about buildings, historical events and people related to places in the old counties of England, before they were reorganised in 1974. The maps are meant to be read and framed and to stimulate conversation.

Carr's small books are typically 16 stapled pages, usually about 13 x 9 cm, with decorated card covers. Carr wrote: 'These books fit small envelopes, go for a minimum stamp and are perfect for cold bedrooms - only one hand and a wrist need suffer exposure'. Carr recorded in 1983 that sales of the small books reached a peak in 1980, when he sold 43,369 copies, and by 1987 he had sold more than 500,000 in total. Many titles are still published by the Quince Tree Press, as well as some new ones, for example Florence Nightingale and Laurence Sterne.

Carr sold his novels and small books published by the Quince Tree Press directly to booksellers and by mail order to readers, and offered copies of his other novels bought as remainders from his previous publishers. For example, Carr obtained 900 remaindered copies of The Harpole Report from Secker and Warburg at 12 pence each and was able to sell them all at their full price of £1.75 after Frank Muir had named it on Desert Island Discs as the book he would take with him to the imaginary island.

== Novels by J. L. Carr published by the Quince Tree Press ==
At the age of 76 years and unhappy both with the different publishers of his six novels to date and with the advance that he had been offered for his seventh novel, Carr decided to publish the next book himself. What Hetty Did was published as a paperback by the Quince Tree Press in 1988 in an edition of 2,850 copies and was soon reprinted. Carr followed this novel four years later with his last, Harpole & Foxberrow General Publishers, in an edition of 4,000 copies.

Carr also bought back the rights to the novels A Month in the Country, How Steeple Sinderby Wanderers Won the F.A. Cup and The Battle of Pollocks Crossing and published them under the imprint of the Quince Tree Press. Since Carr's death in 1994, the rest of Carr's novels have been reprinted by the Quince Tree Press.

- (1988) What Hetty Did. (ISBN 9780900847912). First edition. First issue 2,850 copies; 2nd issue 3,000 copies.
- (1991) A Month in the Country. (ISBN 9780900847929). First issue, 3,000 copies. Revised edition of novel first published by Harvester Press in 1980.
- (1992) Harpole & Foxberrow General Publishers. (ISBN 9780900847936). First edition. First issue 4,000 copies.
- (1992) How Steeple Sinderby Wanderers Won the F.A. Cup. (ISBN 9780900847943). First issue 2,000 copies. New edition of novel first published by London Magazine Editions in 1975.
- (1993) The Battle of Pollocks Crossing. (ISBN 9780900847967). First issue 2,000 copies. New edition of novel first published by Viking Penguin in 1985.
- (2003) A Day in Summer. (ISBN 9781904016076). New edition of novel first published by Barrie and Rockliff in 1963.
- (2003) A Season in Sinji. (ISBN 9781904016083). New edition of novel first published by Alan Ross in 1967.
- (2003) The Harpole Report. (ISBN 9781904016069). New edition of novel first published by Secker and Warburg in 1972.

In each of his novels published by the Quince Tree Press Carr cited words by Beatrice Warde, an eminent American typographer:

"This is a Printing Office,
Cross-roads of Civilisation,
Refuge of all the Arts against the Ravages of Time.
From this place Words may fly abroad,
Not to perish as Waves of Sound but fix'd in Time,
Not corrupted by the hurrying Hand but verified in Proof.
Friend, you are on Safe Ground:
This is a Printing Office."

== Illustrated maps ==
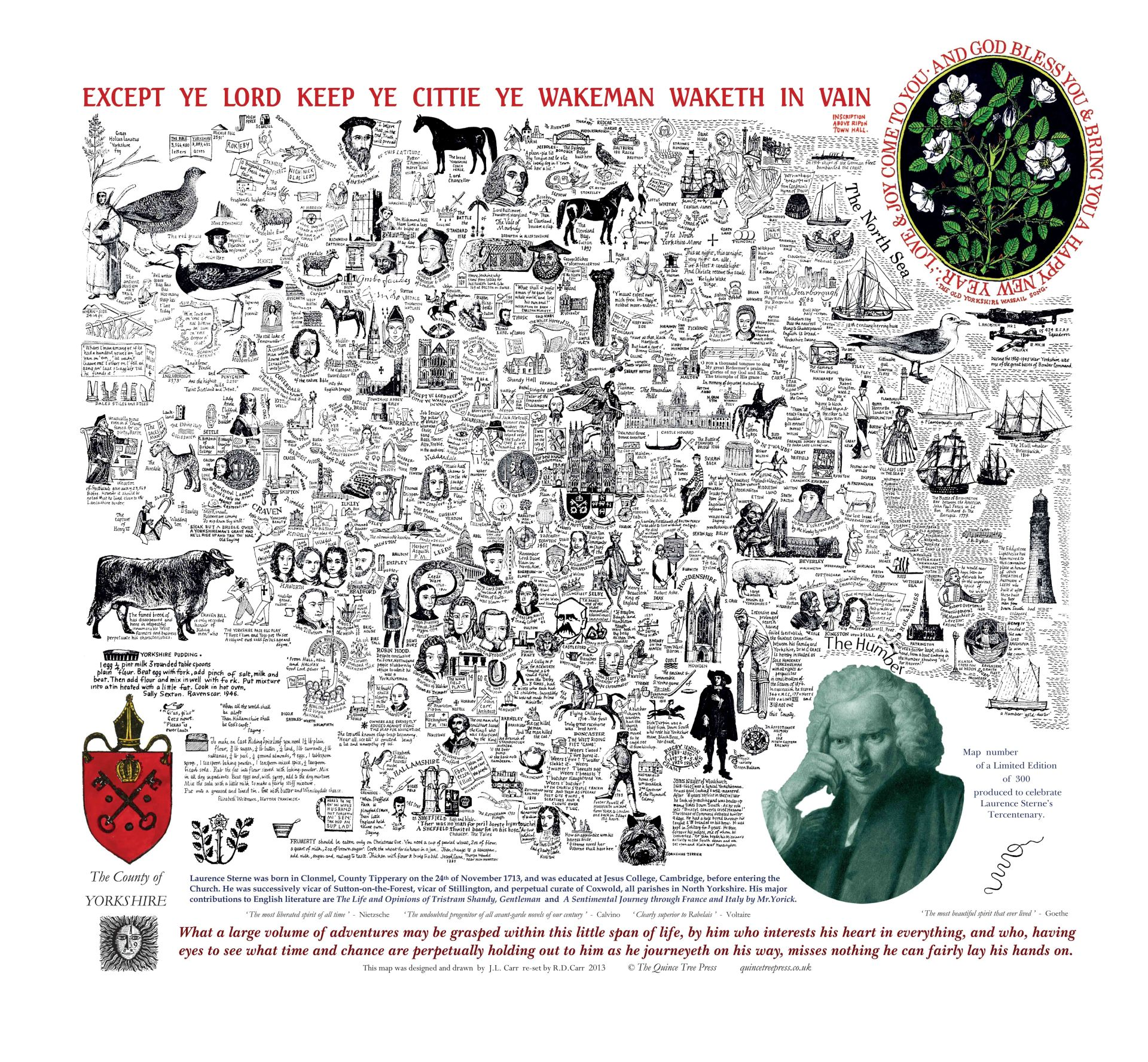
A literary map of Yorkshire by Carr

Carr drew his first map in 1943, of England and Wales, while stationed in West Africa during the Second World War. Carr reported that the first four maps he published were of Yorkshire, Gloucestershire, Kent and Norfolk and initially sold for £1 each. However these may have been preceded in late 1965 by what Carr called a 'longsheet', a narrow printed drawing showing towns and places in Northamptonshire which stated at the base: 'Travellers are warned that the use of this map for navigation will be disastrous'. The first five maps given ISBNs were Hampshire (December 1968; ISBN 0900847034), Wales (March 1969, ISBN 0900847042), Sussex (June 1969; ISBN 0900847050), Kent (September 1969; ISBN 0900847018) and Yorkshire (September 1969; ISBN 0900847026). An ISBN was allocated to 54 maps in total, the last issued in December 1976 (Westmorland, ISBN 0900847751), but no maps have been seen with a printed ISBN.

The different versions of most county maps were not numbered or identified sequentially and only a few were dated, so it is hard to tell in which order they were published. Versions may be distinguished by the number of sheets printed, which was usually recorded on later maps, and assuming that the number was different for each version. The first versions of maps seem to have been issued in editions of 250, 350 or 500 sheets. Robert Carr has reported that some of the maps had editions related to the year in which they were printed. For example, an edition of 978 sheets was probably first published in 1978. The number of sheets of the versions recorded with an ISBN and seen or held in private or public collections are given below and range from 250 to 982 with an average of about 750. If the number of sheets issued was recorded on the version then each individual map was usually numbered by hand, although unnumbered copies are known. The number of different versions published before August 1987, the date of Carr's history of the Press, is shown in parentheses below and at least three new maps (Buckinghamshire, Westmorland and Wiltshire) were added after 1987. A total of 97 maps were either reported by Carr in his history of the Quince Tree Press, or have been seen. There may be more maps and more versions. A new map of Northamptonshire was produced in 2005 by Robert and Jane Carr.

Carr's illustrated maps were printed on single sheets of thick paper of various types and range in size from 50 to 65 cm high and 35 to 55 cm wide, depending on the shape of each county. The early maps were printed in monochrome but some were hand coloured by Sally Carr. Later maps were printed in colour. Most of the maps were numbered by hand and signed by Carr. Carr often sent proof copies of new maps to retailers. These were printed on thin, poor quality paper, and were marked PROOF. The maps were chiefly printed by Messrs Richardson or Seddon, local printers in Kettering.

The list below gives details where known of: the number of different maps of each county, shown in parentheses, as recorded by Carr in 1987 in his history of the Quince Tree Press; the date of publication with the ISBN, although such numbers seem only to have been applied to maps published between 1968 and 1976 and were not noted on the maps themselves; and the number of sheets, if known, which are not necessarily given in the order of publication.

- England and Wales. Editions in July 1972 of 750 sheets (written by hand)(ISBN 090084731X) and May 1973, numbering unknown, (ISBN 0900847344).
- Wales. Edition in March 1969 of 569 sheets (ISBN 0900847042).
- Bedfordshire. Edition in September 1975 of 574 sheets (ISBN 0900847522).
- Berkshire. Edition in December 1974 of 773 sheets (ISBN 0900847816).
- Buckinghamshire. Edition in September 1975 of 574 sheets, (ISBN 0900847530).
- Cambridgeshire. Edition in 1974 of 743 sheets (ISBN 0900847824).
- Cheshire (2). Edition in May 1974 of 774 sheets? (ISBN 0900847409) and 1982 of 982 sheets?.
- Cornwall. Edition in September 1975 of 775 sheets (ISBN 0900847514).
- Cumberland. Edition in March 1977 of 777 sheets (ISBN 0900847778).
- Derbyshire (3). Edition in September 1975 of 773 sheets (ISBN 0900847549) and 1980? of 980 sheets; other version, unknown.
- Devon (2). Edition in May 1970 of 503 sheets (ISBN 0900847263) and 1978? of 978 sheets.
- Dorset. Edition in 1974 of 773 sheets (ISBN 0900847263).
- Durham (2). Edition in 1974 of 773 sheets (ISBN 0900847840), and 1982? of 982 sheets.
- Essex (3). Edition in September 1971 of 503 sheets? (ISBN 0900847212); September 1975 of 775 sheets? (ISBN 0900847425); and other unknown.
- Gloucestershire (3). Editions in May 1972 of 250 sheets? (ISBN 0900847166); September 1975 of 774 sheets? (ISBN 0900847433); and unknown date of 300 sheets.
- Hampshire (3). Editions in December 1968 of 524? sheets (ISBN 0900847034); September 1975 of 574? sheets (ISBN 0900847441); and 1981 of 981 sheets?.
- Herefordshire (2). Edition in September 1972 (ISBN 0900847328) and 1981?, 572 and 981 sheets.
- Hertfordshire. Edition in September 1975 of 773 sheets (ISBN 0900847557).
- Huntingdonshire (2). Edition in August 1971 of 350 sheets (ISBN 0900847220); and in 1980? of 980 sheets.
- Kent (4). Editions in September 1969 of 507? sheets(ISBN 0900847018); September 1975, unknown sheets (ISBN 090084745X); and 1980 of 980 sheets.
- Lancashire or County Palatine of Lancashire (2). Editions in April 1971 of 777 sheets (ISBN 090084728X); and in 1980? of 980 sheets.
- County Palatine of Lancaster Edition of 572 sheets.
- Leicestershire (3). Editions in April 1972 503 sheets (ISBN 0900847298); in 1982? of 982 sheets; other unknown date of 572 sheets.
- Lincolnshire (3). Editions in October 1970 of 503 sheets (ISBN 0900847107); 1981? of 981 sheets; other edition unknown.
- Middlesex. Edition in September 1975 of 775 sheets (ISBN 0900847506).
- Norfolk (3). Editions in December 1969 of 500? sheets (ISBN 0900847085) and September 1975 of 705? sheets (ISBN 0900847476); and other edition unknown.
- Northamptonshire (3). A 'longsheet' in 1965 of an unknown number of sheets. Maps in November 1970 of 550? sheets (ISBN 0900847123); September 1975 of unknown sheets (ISBN 0900847468); 1978 of 978 sheets; and 1980? of 980 sheets. New edition in 2005.
- Northumberland (2). Edition in September 1971 of 502 sheets (ISBN 0900847204); and 1980? of 980 sheets.
- Nottinghamshire. Edition in September 1975 of 774 sheets (ISBN 0900847565).
- Oxfordshire. Edition in December 1969 of 350 sheets (ISBN 0900847077).
- Rutland (3). Editions in April 1972 of 500? sheets (ISBN 0900847271); 1974 of unknown sheets (ISBN 0900847859); and 1978? of 978 sheets.
- Shropshire. Edition in October 1974 of 750 sheets.
- Somerset (2). Editions in May 1971 of 502? sheets(ISBN 0900847158) and September 1975 of unknown sheets (ISBN 0900847484).
- Staffordshire (2). Editions of September 1975 of 750 sheets (ISBN 0900847573); and 1982? of 982 sheets.
- Suffolk (4). Editions in Winter, 1968 of 250 sheets? (ISBN 090084700X); May 1971 of sheets unknown (ISBN 0900847174); September 1975 of 775 sheets (ISBN 0900847492); other map unknown.
- Surrey (2). Editions in September 1975 of 774 sheets (ISBN 0900847581); and 1980 of 980 sheets.
- Sussex (2). Editions in June 1969, not numbered (ISBN 0900847050); and 1978 of 978 sheets.
- Warwickshire (3). Editions in November 1970 of 526 or 574 sheets (ISBN 0900847115); in 1980? of 980 sheets; and other unknown
- Westmorland. Edition in December 1976 of 776 sheets (ISBN 0900847751)
- Wiltshire (2). Editions in October 1969 of 250 sheets (ISBN 0900847069); and May 1971 of 981 sheets (ISBN 0900847182).
- Worcestershire (2). Edition in September 1972 of 572 sheets (ISBN 0900847336); and 1976? of 776 sheets.
- Yorkshire (6). Editions in September 1969 (ISBN 0900847026), May 1971 (ISBN 0900847190), September 1975 (ISBN 0900847417) and 1982?, 571, 572, 573, 773, 776 and 982 sheets.

== Small books ==
Carr's small books are typically 16 stapled pages, 13.0 cm high by 9.5 cm wide, with illustrated card covers unless otherwise noted. Carr launched the series in 1966 with books of poems by William Blake, Andrew Marvell and John Clare whose grandson, Albert, a retired co-op milkman, lived on the same road. The first edition of John Clare's poems was published by Carr for the Northants County Association of the N.U.T., not by the Quince Tree Press. Some of the early books of poems were given an ISBN by Carr from a list of 100 numbers that he was allocated as a publisher, but he did not allocate the numbers in order and did not print the ISBN in any small book that he published. The early titles were registered as published in a Florin Poets Series or a Mini-poets Series. Several of the small books were illustrated by the artist Christopher Fiddes.

A few books are dated or can be dated by their publication to coincide with a particular event, such as the Peasants' Revolt of 1381. Some books are numbered, but the numbers are not always unique: at least nine are numbered 71 (Francis Bacon, Thomas Bewick, Geoffrey Chaucer, John Donne, Hilda Frank, Joan Hassall, Samuel Johnson, Bryan North Lee and the Rossettis) and six are numbered 85 (John Bunyan, Gerard Manley Hopkins, Edwards Lear, the Devil's Dictionary, The Dictionary of Parsons and Henry Vaughan). It seems that Carr applied a partial numbering system retrospectively in the order in which he published the work of a poet. For example, a later impression of the poems of Andrew Marvell is numbered 3, but no impressions of any small books numbered 1 or 2 have been seen while no small books numbered 4,5 or 6 have been seen but two are numbered 7 (Rupert Brooke/Wilfred Owen and William Barnes). A few of the dictionaries list the impressions published but none of the books of poems list the printing history. Carr mostly had 3,000 copies printed at a time, sometimes using a different background colour on the cover for a new impression. Carr is known to have published at least 102 small books in his series, most of which are listed below. Many titles are currently reprinted by the Quince Tree Press, which is now run by Robert and Jane Carr in Bury St Edmunds, and they have published several new titles, which are noted.

=== Poets ===
Most small books are of the work of a single poet, some are of two, usually printed back to back, such as Rupert Brooke and Wilfred Owen. There are at least two editions of some poets: for example, there are two editions of poems by Thomas Herrick and George Byron, each issued with a different cover. But there are also at least two editions of different poems of John Clare, both of which used the same photograph of a bronze bust of Clare on the cover. The numbering of editions may not necessarily be consecutive. The first book of the poems of Robert Herrick, which is entitled Ten Poems and is not numbered, was probably published before the second, entitled Parson and Poet, which is numbered 9 in the series. Carr seems to have applied the number 9 retrospectively to the second book, perhaps because the first book of Herrick's poems was the ninth that he published. No numbered editions of the poems of William Blake or John Clare have been seen, which were two of the first three titles, but a later edition of the poems of Andrew Marvell is numbered 3.

- Matthew Arnold. The Scholar Gypsy and verses from Thyrsis. Cover by Christopher Fiddes.
- William Barnes. Ten Dorset dialect poems and Thomas Hardy's Farewell. Later impression, No. 7.
- Hilaire Belloc. Twenty-eight poems published at his grandson's wish. Cover by Christopher Fiddes. 2nd impression, No. 95.
- William Blake. Fourteen poems. Cover by Christopher Fiddes. Later impression, No. 92.
- Rupert Brooke and Wilfred Owen, printed back to back. Four sonnets and nine poems. Cover by J. L. Carr. Later impression, No. 7.
- Robert Browning. Seven poems. No. 92.
- Robert Browning and Elizabeth Browning. Six poems and four sonnets. Cover by J. L. Carr.
- Robert Burns. Love songs. Cover by Christopher Fiddes. No. 63. Dated March 1, 1984.
- George Byron I. Poems.
- George Byron II. Three poems and from Don Juan. No. 95.
- Lewis Carroll. The Hunting of the Snark. Cover by J. L. Carr. No. 75.
- Geoffrey Chaucer. The Reeve's Tale. No. 71
- Gilbert Keith Chesterton. Twelve poems arranged by Heulwen Cox. No. 99
- John Clare. Sixteen poems.
- Samuel Coleridge. The Voyage of Coleridge's Ancient Mariner. Drawn and written down by Christopher Fiddes. 1978.
- Abraham Cowley. The Country Mouse written out and illustrated by David Hopkins.
- William Cowper. Selected poems. Later impression, No 84.
- George Crabbe. Peter Grimes (abridged). Cover by J. L. Carr.
- John Donne. Cover by J. L. Carr. Later impression, No. 71.
- John Dryden. Twelve satirical portraits. Cover by J. L. Carr.
- James Flecker. Six poems and from The Golden Journey. Cover by J. L. Carr. Later impression, No. 92.
- Oliver Goldsmith. The Deserted Village. Recalled by Christopher Fiddes, 1978. Later impression, No. 41.
- Thomas Gray. Elegy Written in a Country Churchyard. Cover by Christopher Fiddes.
- Thomas Hardy. Fourteen poems. Illustrated by Christopher Fiddes. Later impression, No 49.
- George Herbert. Eleven poems. Cover by J. L. Carr.
- Robert Herrick I. Ten Poems.
- Robert Herrick II. Parson and poet. 23 poems or extracts. No. 9.
- Tom Hood. Six poems. Cover by J. L. Carr. No. 69.
- Gerard Hopkins. Fifteen poems, edited and cover by Nina Steane. No 85.
- A. E. Housman. Poems from A Shropshire Lad. Cover by Christopher Fiddes. No. 90.
- John Keats. Eight poems and extracts from letters edited by Elizabeth Farrer.
- Rudyard Kipling. Nine poems. Cover by William Strang. No. 92.
- Charles Lamb and Thomas Moore. Essay Dream Children by Lamb and nine poems by Moore.
- Edward Lear. Five poems. No. 85.
- Henry Wadsworth Longfellow. Extracts from The Song of Hiawatha. Cover by J. L. Carr. No. 18.
- Omar Khayyam translated by Edward Fitzgerald. Extracts from The Rubaiyat. Cover by J. L. Carr.
- Thomas Macaulay. Extracts from How Horatius Held the Bridge. Cover by J. L. Carr.
- Andrew Marvell I. Five poems. Contains: To his coy mistress, The Garden, The Bermudas, From An Horatian ode, from Appleton House. No. 3
- Andrew Marvell II. Contains: To his coy mistress, The Garden, from Appleton House, The Bermudas, Cromwell's return from Ireland, plus 3 rhyming portraits for Henry Jermyn, Earl of St Albans; Ann Hyde, Duchess of York; and Charles II's mistress, the Countess of Castlemaine.
- John Milton. Il Penseroso and L'Allegro. Later impression, No. 85.
- William Morris. The haystack in the floods and four others.
- Wilfred Owen. Eight poems (and four blank pages).
- Alexander Pope. Extract from An essay on Man and An Essay On Criticism. Cover by J. L. Carr.
- Dante Gabriel Rossetti. Fifteen poems.
- Dante Gabriel Rossetti and Christina Rossetti. Eight poems and nine poems. Cover by Nina Carroll. Later impression, No. 71.
- Walter Scott. Poems. Seven poems. No. 78
- William Shakespeare. Sixteen sonnets. Cover by J. L. Carr. Later impression, No. 50.
- Percy Shelley. Eight poems and some letters. Edited by Elizabeth Farrer. Cover by Christopher Fiddes.
- John Skelton. Five poems. Cover by J. L. Carr. No. 66.
- Christopher Smart. Lines from Rejoice in the lamb. No 63.
- Robert Louis Stevenson. Twenty one poems. Cover by Christopher Fiddes.
- Algernon Charles Swinburne. Nine poems. Cover by J. L. Carr. No. 73.
- Alfred Tennyson 1. Lincolnshire Landscape
- Alfred Tennyson 2. Mariana and eight poems. Cover by Christopher Fiddes.
- Edward Thomas. Adlestrop and eleven poems. Edited by Sally Muir, illustrated by Peter Newcombe.
- Francis Thompson and Ernest Dowson. The Hound of Heaven and others.
- Henry Vaughan. Sacred poems and private ejaculations. No. 85.
- Oscar Wilde. Extracts from The Ballad of Reading Gaol. Cover by J. L. Carr.
- William Wordsworth. Daffodils and fourteen poems. Cover by Christopher Fiddes.

=== Collected poems ===
- The death of Parcy Reed. The Battle of Otterburn. Cover by J. L. Carr. No. 76.
- A Christmas Book. An anthology of words and pictures. No. 52. (Reissued by R. D. & J. M Carr, ISBN 1-904016-04-9)
- The Hearth and Home Reciter. Elizabeth Welbourn's Celebrated Reciter for all Occasions. Sixteen poems plus guidance for elocutionists. No 55.

=== Dictionaries ===
Carr's dictionaries have their origins in the Year Books of the Midlands Club Cricket Conference in the early 1950s, nearly 30 years before the first dictionary was published. For the 1950 Year Book Carr wrote 'A Miniature Anthology for Damp Days', a collection of quotations and anecdotes about notable cricketers, then followed this in the 1951 Year Book with a cartoon and more entries, seemingly to fill empty spaces at the bottom of pages. Carr developed this idea fully in 1977 when he published a 16-page dictionary containing 126 entries on notable cricketers and events related to cricket. It was an immediate success and led to an order from the bookseller W. H. Smith, for 4,000 copies of a title that had initially been printed in an edition of only 3,000. This popular bookseller may also have sold early editions of some poets as an edition of William Barnes is known to contain a W. H. Smith & Son price sticker for 10p, which dates it after Decimal Day in February 1971. The Dictionary of Extra-ordinary Cricketers was reprinted at least nine times between 1977 and 1981 before it was republished by Quartet Books in 1983. A new edition with cartoon illustrations drawn by Carr was published by Aurum Press in 2005.

Carr's wife, Sally, proposed the next Dictionary, of English Queens, to coincide with the Silver Jubilee of Queen Elizabeth in 1977, which he then followed with a Dictionary of English Kings. Carr is believed to be the author of Welbourn's Dictionary of Prelates, Parsons, etc, as Welbourn was his mother's maiden name. The compiler of two dictionaries of eponymous terms, A. J. Forrest, was a cricket writer, while the only biographical information provided about Mr R. G. E. Sandbach, who compiled the Dictionary of Astonishing British Animals, was that he lived in Tunbridge Wells.

Carr said that he was planning other dictionaries and a dictionary of Alchemists is listed inside the back cover of Forrest's Dictionary of Eponymous Places but, according to Robert Carr, it was never published. The Dictionaries are listed below in what is believed to be their order of publication.

- J. L. Carr (1977). Carr's Dictionary of Extra-ordinary English cricketers. 126 entries. First published July 1977. Revised September 1977, January 1978.
- J. L. Carr (1977). Carr's Dictionary of English Queens, Kings' Wives, Celebrated Paramours, Handfast Spouses and Royal Changelings. The Quince Tree Press. 91 entries. No. 84. (ISBN 0-900847-78-6). First published to coincide with the Queen's Silver Jubilee.
- A. J. Forrest (1978). Forrest's Dictionary of Eponymists. 135 entries. First published February 1978, revised April and November 1978.
- J. L. Carr. Carr's Dictionary of English Kings, Consorts, Pretenders, Usurpers, Unnatural Claimants and Royal Athelings. The Quince Tree Press. 107 entries. (Reissued by R. D. & J. M. Carr, ISBN 1-904016-02-2).
- R. G. E. Sandbach. Sandbach's Dictionary of Astonishing British Animals. 105 entries collected by R. G. E. Sandbach, edited by J. L. Carr. A later edition with a green, not blue, cover has an Appendix with another 37 entries.
- J. L. Carr (1985). Gidner's Brief Lives of the Frontier. 88 entries. No. 77. Issued as a companion volume to The Battle of Pollocks Crossing, published in 1985.
- J. L. Carr. Welbourn's Dictionary of Prelates, Parsons, Vergers, Wardens, Sidesmen and Preachers, Sunday-school teachers, Hermits, Ecclesiastical Flower-arrangers, Fifth Monarchy Men and False Prophets. 129 entries. No. 85.
- Ambrose Bierce. The Devil's Dictionary. 223 entries selected by Mike Hill. No 85.
- A. J. Forrest. Forrest's Dictionary of Eponymous Places. 108 entries. No. 94. A reissue in 1990 of a title first published by A. J. Forrest himself in 1981.
- J. L. Carr. A Dictionary of Extraordinary English cricketers Volume 2. 79 entries and a poem by Francis Meynell. No 95.
- J. L. Carr (2005). Carr's Dictionary of Extra-ordinary English cricketers. Introduction by Matthew Engel. Aurum Press and the Quince Tree Press. (ISBN 978-1-84513-081-7).

=== Other small books by Carr ===
- J. L. Carr (1981?) Forefathers. An illustrated essay on Anglo-Norse carvings and identity.
- J. L. Carr. The Territory versus Fleming. Transcript of a murder trial edited from an 1887 Dakota newspaper.
- J. L. Carr (1987). An inventory and history of The Quince Tree Press to mark its 21st year and the sale of its 500,000th small book. August 1987, pp. 24.
- J. L. Carr (1994). Some early poems and recent drawings by J. L. Carr 1912 - 1994. (Published by R. D. & J. M. Carr).

=== Artist's picture books ===
Although Carr's first picture book celebrated the work of the English wood engraver Thomas Bewick, his main aim was to champion the small number of 20th century wood engravers, whose work he thought was neglected. Each book contains small reproductions of examples of each artist's work with no text, usually printed on better quality paper than the small books of poems. Of the 19 artist's picture books, 15 were published by J. L. Carr and four new artists have been added to the series by Robert and Jane Carr.

- Thomas Bewick. Extracts from his autobiography and engravings. No. 71.
- Joseph Crawhall. The Babes in the Wood and 22 prints.
- George Cruikshank. The Black Bottle, designed By Heulwen Williams (1991), No 100.
- Clare Dalby's Picture Book. No. 93.
- Edwina Ellis. The Picture Book of Edwina Ellis.
- Myles Birket Foster. Seventeen engravings.
- Hilda Frank. The Picture Book of Hilda Frank. No. 71.
- Marie Hartley's Picture Book. (Published by R.D. & J.M. Carr)
- Joan Hassall's Picture Book. No. 71.
- John Lawrence's Picture Book. No. 99.
- George Mackley's Picture Book.
- Săsa Marinkov's Picture Book. (Published by R.D. & J.M Carr, ISBN 1-904016-00-6)
- Hilary Paynter's Picture Book.
- Monica Poole's Picture Book. No. 84.
- Gwen Raverat Wood Engravings. (Published by R.D. & J.M. Carr, ISBN 1-904016-05-7)
- Yvonne Skargon's Picture Book. (Published by R.D. & J.M. Carr)
- Ian Stephens's Picture Book, No 94.
- Margaret Wells' Picture Book, arranged by Heulwen Williams, No 95.
- Sarah van Niekerk Her Picture Book. No. 61.

=== Other picture books ===
- A Little Book of Bookplates. Thirty-six bookplates selected by Bryan (= Brian) North Lee. No 71.
- The Good Children's Book. Seventeen prints illustrating moral behaviour. A facsimile of an 1820 edition.
- The Pleasing Instructor. Or, A Packet of Pictures for all good children with prose explanations and poetical applications embellished with numerous engravings. No 95.

=== Text by English and other writers ===
- John Aubrey. Fifty-six brief lives.
- Jane Austen. The History of England by a Partial, Prejudiced and Ignorant Historian. First published November 1977.
- Francis Bacon. Six essays as published contemporaneously. No 71.
- John Bunyan. From The Pilgrim's Progress. Cover by J. L. Carr. Woodcuts by Christoper Fiddes. No. 85.
- William Cobbett. Edited by Edmund Kirby. Cover by J. L. Carr.
- The Song of Songs. Extracts from The King James Version, No. 90.
- Edward Gibbon. The Fall of Constantinople. Cover by J. L. Carr.
- Samuel Johnson. The Sayings of Chairman Johnson. One letter and various pronouncements edited by Edmund Kirby. No. 71.
- Thomas Malory. Le Morte d'Arthur. Cover by J. L. Carr.
- Florence Nightingale. Extracts from letters and reports. (Published by R.D. & J.M. Carr, ISBN 1-904016-18-9)
- John Ruskin. Extracts from his letters and writings. (Published by R. D. & J. M. Carr, ISBN 1-904016-15-4).
- Sydney Smith. Biographical and conversational extracts. Cover by Sally Carr.
- Laurence Sterne. Extracts from Tristram Shandy, illustrated by Martin Rowson. (Published by R. D. & J. M. Carr, ISBN 1-904016-17-0)
- Duke of Wellington. What they said and what he said. (ISBN 0-900847-98-0).

=== Inflammatory evangelical tracts ===
This is the heading given by Carr to these books in An inventory and history of The Quince Tree Press etc.

- The Poor Man's guide to the Revolt of 1381. No. 50?
- The Young Woman's Old Testament. Verbatim extracts from King James's version typical of their authors' attitude towards women. No. 85.

== Commissioned celebratory cards ==
These were illustrated cards in the style of maps with many small drawings and hand-written notes.

- Forefathers, a guide to Anglo-Norse carvings dedicated to Edmund Blunden.
- Pictorial Guide to St Mary's Church, the Chichele School and the Bede House at Highham Ferrers.
- Pictorial Guide to Peterborough Cathedral.
- The One Thousandth Anniversary of Earls Barton Church.
- The One Thousandth Anniversary of Brixworth Church
- The Two Hundred and Fiftieth Anniversary of the Ordination of Philip Doddridge, Northampton.
- Northamptonshire Baptismal Fonts.
- Northamptonshire Steeples and Spires.
- Northamptonshire.
- Norman Northamptonshire
