= The Old Timers =

1957 book by J. L. Carr

- Author: J. L. Carr
- Language: English
- Genre: Social History
- Publisher: Privately printed
- Publication date: 1957
- Publication place: United States
- Media type: Print (Hardback)
- Pages: 69
- Followed by: A Day in Summer

The Old Timers is a rare, privately printed book published in 1957 by the school teacher, map-maker, publisher and author J. L. Carr during his second visit to teach at a public school in Huron, South Dakota, United States.

== Background ==
At the age of 25 years, after training as a teacher, J. L. Carr applied to the English-Speaking Union for a year's exchange as a teacher and arrived in Huron, South Dakota on 1 October 1938. Some of his experiences in Huron were incorporated into the novel The Battle of Pollocks Crossing.

After military service during the war in the Royal Air Force in West Africa and in military intelligence in England, Carr returned to teaching. In 1951 he was appointed as the first headmaster of Highfields primary school in Kettering, Northamptonshire. He took a sabbatical in 1956 to return to Huron with his wife Sally and son Robert, to spend another year at Huron Public School.

During this time Carr wrote a book about some of the first European settlers in Beadle County, South Dakota which he entitled: The Old Timers. A social history of the way of life of the home-steading pioneers in the prairie states during the first few years of settlement, as shown by a typical community, the 'old-timers' of Beadle County in South Dakota.

== Content ==
The book consists of reminiscences of the men and women who established settlements on the land around Huron in South Dakota from the 1880s onwards, or descriptions of those pioneers given by people who knew them. Carr recorded in an interview in 1991 how he found the notes left by speakers at a defunct historical society that he had attended during his first visit in 1938. The notes and verbatim records of the County Historical Society meetings had been kept by Sherman Davis, Dr Ketelle and Mrs J. P. Walsh, and these formed the basis of Carr's book.

The Old Timers describes how the earlier settlers lived: how they built houses, wells and cyclone shelters; the domestic implements they used such as table lamps, coffee grinders and hand irons; the weather and terrible winters they endured; the children and how they were taught, played and dressed; and the machinery used on the farm such as ploughs and a stone-boat for hauling large rocks. The pages are illustrated with small line drawings. Carr wanted to record the lives of the homesteading pioneers of the prairie before it was all forgotten.

The credit for the book states: "Written in Huron, State of South Dakota, by J.L. Carr of Kettering, the United Kingdom, as a service to the people of the prairie states".

The copyright pages states: "Copyright James Carr, 1957, All Rights reserved". This could be regarded as Carr's first book as his first novel, A Day in Summer, was not published until 1963.

== Physical details ==
The Old Timers was printed on thin, acidic letter-size paper using a Cyclostyle copier with both typed and hand-written text and 180 hand-drawn illustrations and decorations of things in common use such as equipment, buildings, vehicles, plants and flowers.

The book is bound in bright red card on the front cover which is backed with brown cloth over three staples. The rear cover consists of two pieces of dark red card. The cover (290 x 215 mm) has the short title at the top, the circular corporate seal of the City of Huron, 1883, and the author's name, all printed in black.

The 75 leaves, which are printed on one side only, are collated as follows: title page; copyright page; decorated ownership page; Preface, signed and dated by Carr, May 20th 1957 (his birthday); contents and acknowledgements; a map of Beadle County; pages 1 – 2 numbered; pages 3 – 6 un-numbered; pages 7 – 30 numbered; page 31 twice (perhaps only in the copy seen); pages 32 – 53; page 54 missing; pages 55 – 57; page 58 un-numbered; pages 59 – 60; pages 61 – 63 un-numbered; pages 63 (mis-numbered) - 65, which is dated May 20, 1957; two pages of index (prepared by Wilma K Bliss of Huron); one-page list of illustrations; and a one page endpiece.

Another copy has been seen with the contents and acknowledgements page bound immediately after the title page. A copy has been seen that is missing page 39, so other copies may also lack pages, while pages missing from one copy may be found in another copy.

== Print run and holdings ==
Carr reported that he printed 82 copies and paid $18 to have them bound. He gave 40 copies to people who had lent furniture to his family during their stay in Huron and sold the remainder at $2 each to university departments and public libraries.

According to the South Dakota Libraries Network copies can be found in the library of South Dakota State University; Augustana College; Northwestern State University; South Dakota State Library; Rapid City Public Library; Brookings Public Library; and the Siouxland Public Library. There is also a copy in the Morgan Library & Museum, New York City. There is no copy listed in Library Hub Discover, the union catalogue of UK copyright and university libraries. There is a copy in Kettering Public Library.
