= What Hetty Did =

1988 novel by J. L. Carr

- Cover of first edition - 1988
- Author: J. L. Carr
- Cover artist: Joan Hassall
- Language: English
- Genre: Fiction
- Publisher: The Quince Tree Press
- Publication date: 1988
- Publication place: United Kingdom
- Media type: Print (Paperback)
- Pages: 183
- ISBN: 0-900847-91-3
- OCLC: 41547408
- Preceded by: The Battle of Pollocks Crossing
- Followed by: Harpole & Foxberrow General Publishers

What Hetty Did is the seventh novel by J. L. Carr, published in 1988 when he was 76 years old. The novel describes the experiences of an 18-year-old girl. Hetty Birtwisle has been brought up by adoptive parents in the Fens; after a beating by her father, discovering that she was adopted, she flees to Birmingham where she has learnt she was born and alters her surname to Beauchamp.

Hetty Beauchamp comes across several characters from Carr's other novels in the boarding house in which she lives, including Emma Foxberrow, a teacher in The Harpole Report and Edward Peplow, from A Day in Summer.

Carr was offered an advance of £5,000 for the novel, including paperback rights, but as this was the same amount that he had been offered three years earlier for The Battle of Pollocks Crossing, he decided to publish it himself. The book was published in an edition of 2,850 copies and is the first novel published by The Quince Tree Press. As Carr usually offered to send his books post free, he included the price of postage in the price of the book, which had to be printed on the back. However he based postage mistakenly on the cost of sending a Penguin paperback, and What Hetty Did was printed on superior paper with card covers, so it was heavier than expected and he lost money on postage. However the book sold well at £3.95 a copy and he soon had another 3,000 copies printed, at a price of £4.95. The novel is still published by The Quince Tree Press.

The book is notable for the fact that he gave his name as James Carr on the spine and J. L. Carr on the front. Carr was christened Joseph Lloyd and adopted the name 'Jim' or even 'James' in his early 20s.

The story was adapted by Ellen Dryden for BBC Radio 4's Woman's Hour Drama in 2004.

== Translations ==
- 2022 Leben und Werk der Hetty Beauchamp, Dumont Buchverlag Gmbh, (German) ISBN 9783832181857
