= Christopher Fiddes =

English artist

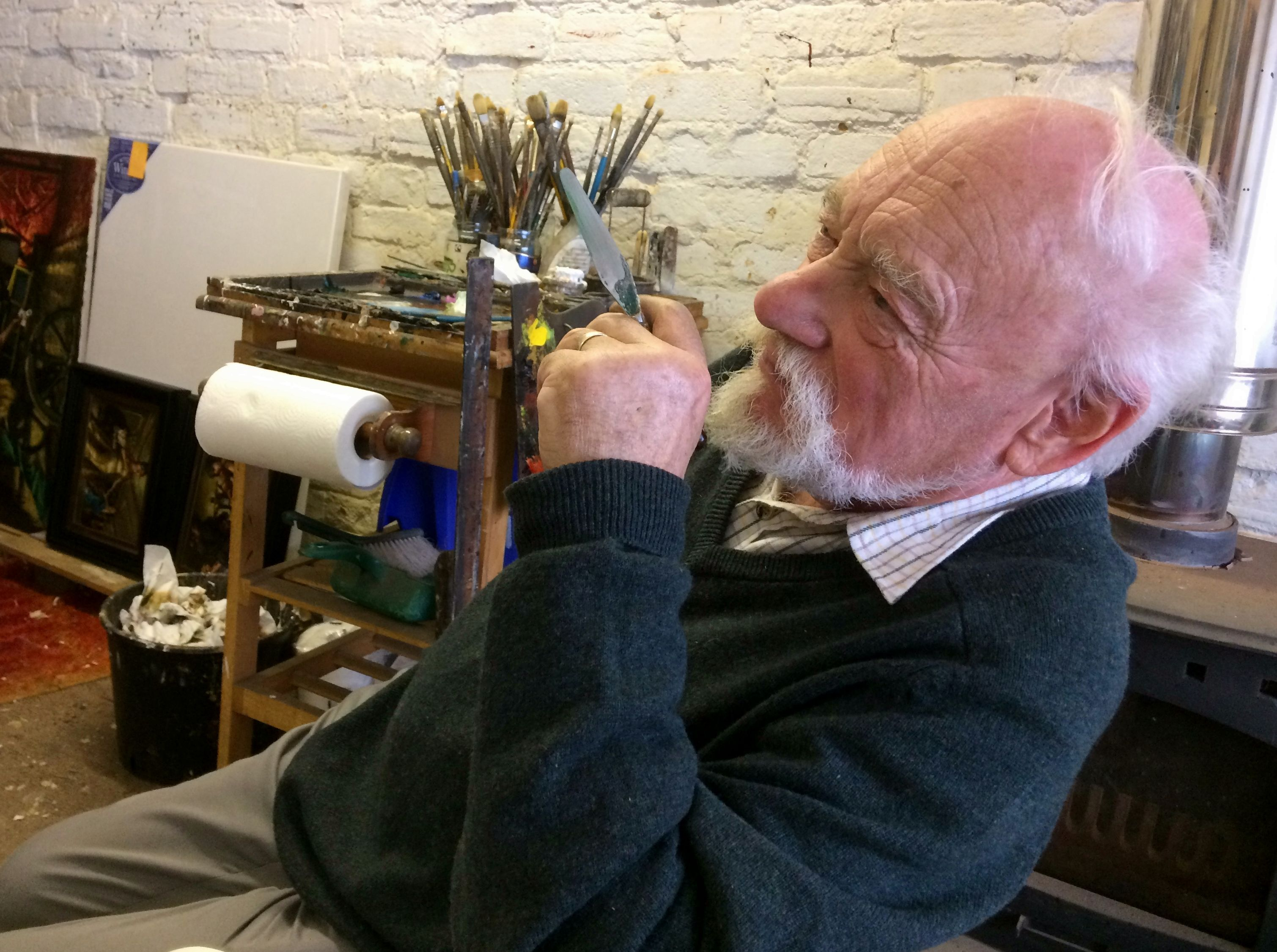
- Born: 1934 (age 91–92); Northampton, England
- Education: Northampton Grammar School; Northampton School of Art
- Occupations: Artist, teacher and art historian
- Known for: Social history and documentary oil paintings
- Notable work: Northern Ireland Series, 1972

Christopher John Ellis Fiddes (born Northampton 13 November 1934) is an English artist, muralist, designer of stained glass and book illustrator. He is also an expert art historian. He has enjoyed a long career as an artist, with prodigious output and driven by a strong belief in the value of traditional drawing and painting techniques that he feels have been largely lost in Post-Modern art movements and the 21st-century commercial art world.

== Education and teaching career ==
Fiddes studied art at Northampton Art School from 1950 to 1954 and then gained an Art Teacher's Diploma at Leicester University. He did two years' National Service in the Northamptonshire Regiment of the British Army and spent time in Hong Kong. In 1957 he started teaching art at a Catholic boys' secondary school and then, in 1972, he became Head of Art at Northampton High School.

== Historic preservation ==
In 1962 he co-founded the Northampton Civic Society with the historian Sir Gyles Isham and local architects and archivists, with the aim of preserving historic buildings from redevelopment. In 1965 he bought a listed house in the village of Cogenhoe and over the next 10 years restored it. His occupation of that house, which is now a listed building, is celebrated with a plaque.

== Paintings and illustrations ==
Most of Fiddes' prolific output is driven by his compulsion to visualise acute social and political commentary. All his major works are painted in oils. They range in mood from dark, savage and sinister to frenetically energetic. The common denominator is a drive to chronicle diverse cultural, social and political episodes of the last seven decades through the lens of a self confessed artistic misfit.

In 1972 he travelled to Northern Ireland as an artist to create a record of The Troubles. His dramatic and graphic paintings were based on sketches he made from close-up observation on both sides of the line. He was commissioned regularly by the author and publisher J. L. Carr to illustrate several of the small books of poetry that Carr published under the imprint of The Quince Tree Press.

In observational quality, nuance and inventiveness Fiddes' canvasses rival the output of the great early satirist printmakers and painters of the 18th century - like Gillray, Hogarth and Goya. He cites Goya as one of his main influences. Yet, in style and technical relish, Fiddes' paintings are idiosyncratic interpretations of anti-establishment thinking, each one inventive in topic and storytelling as well as ingenious in composition and fiendish use of perspective, with which he likes to test himself.

Northampton Museum and Art Gallery hosted Fiddes' first retrospective exhibition (10 July - 17 October 2021) to mark their re-opening after extensive remodelling. The museum is permanent home to 21 oil paintings by Fiddes as well as a few preparatory sketches. In their collection, and in this show, is one of his earliest paintings, "Kowloon Riots". This was painted in 1956 in response to the quelling of the riots that Fiddes witnessed while on his National Service in Kowloon, Hong Kong and it was shown at the Royal Society of British Arts (RBA) at the time.

Fiddes works from his home studio in rural Northamptonshire. He is widowed and has three children - Mark and Clare from his first marriage and Cordelia from his second marriage.

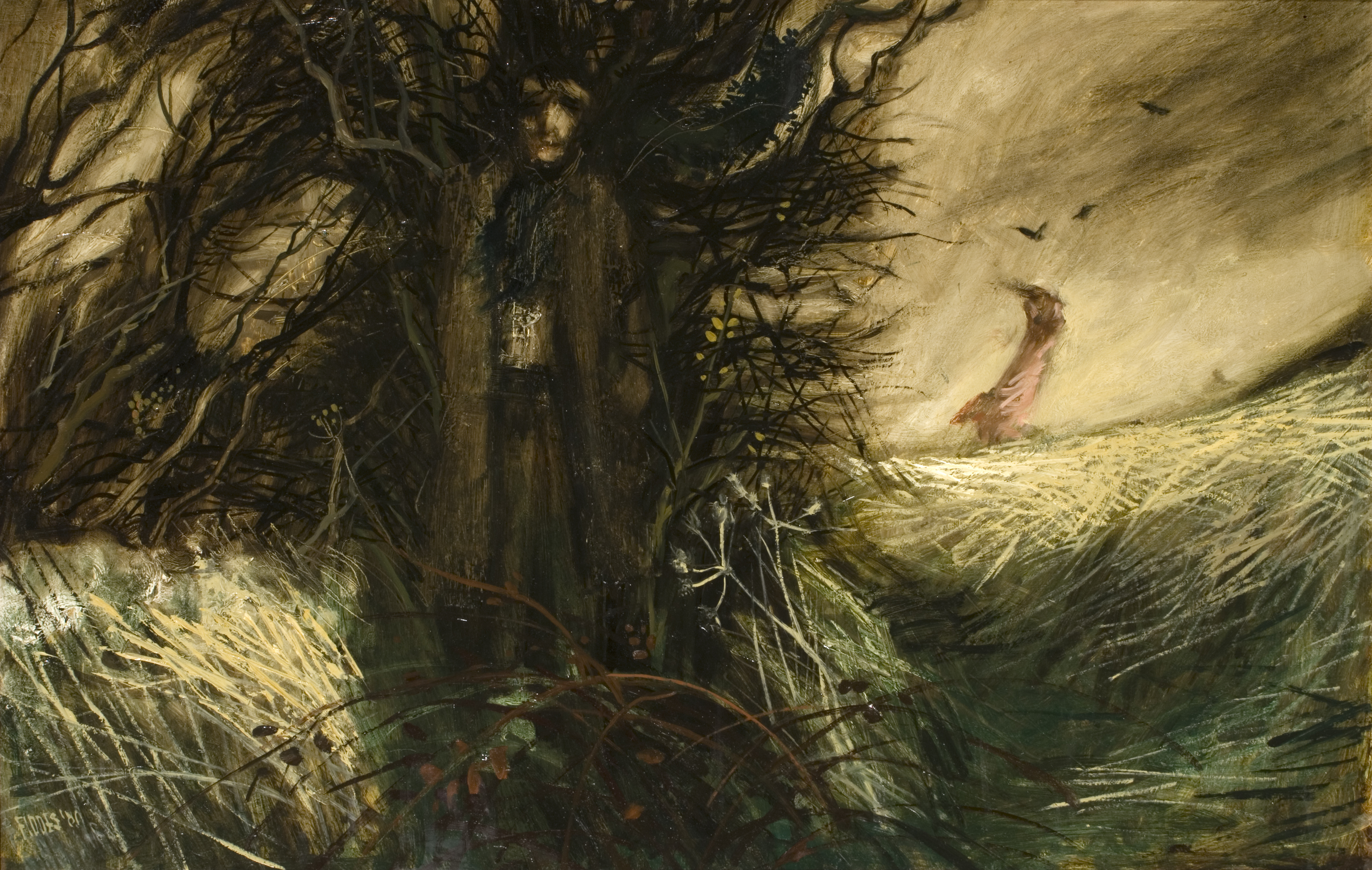
"Shouting in the Wind" by Fiddes

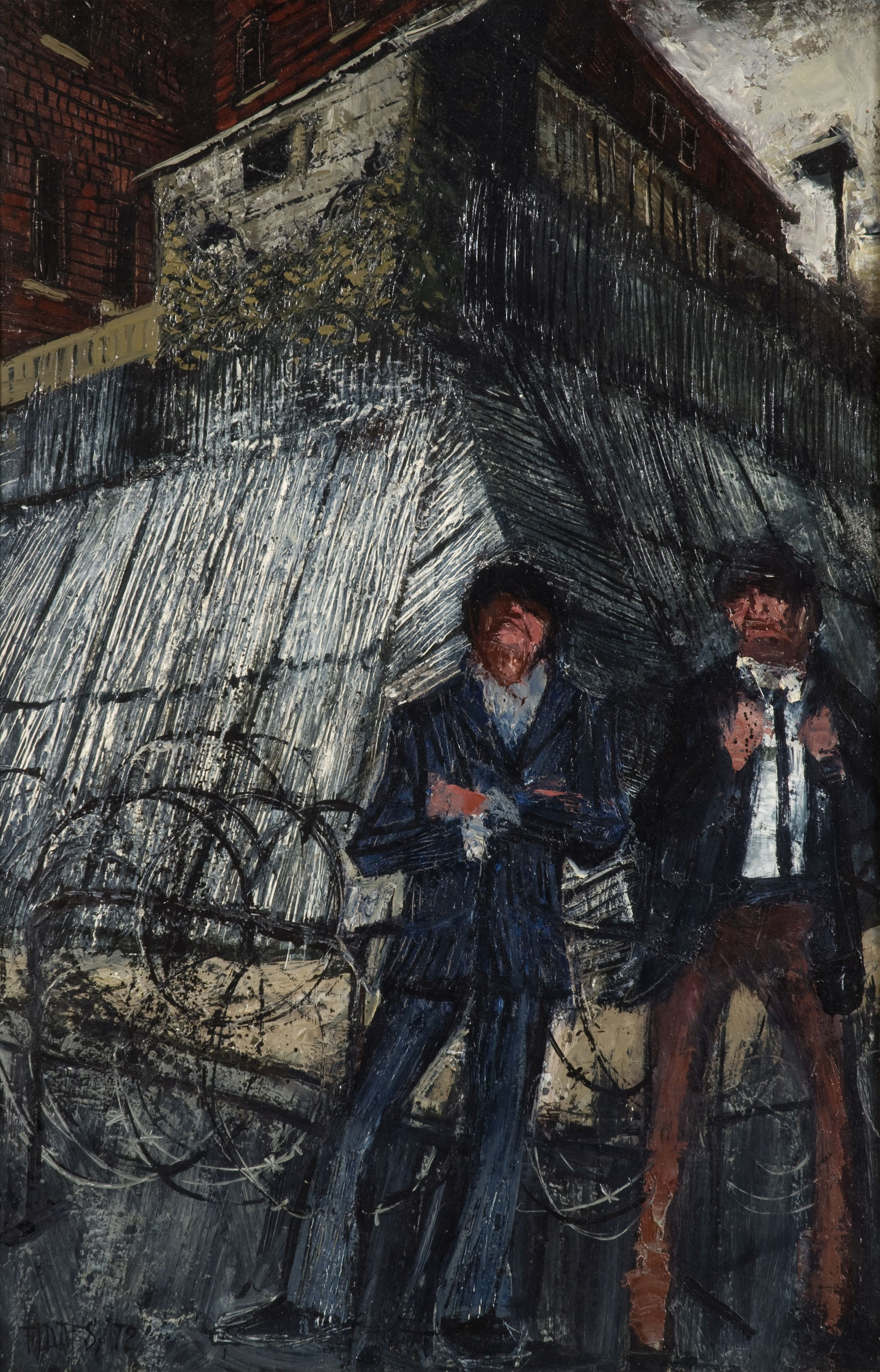
"Police Post, South Belfast" by Fiddes
