= A Month in the Country =

A Month in the Country may refer to:

- A Month in the Country (play), 1872 by Ivan Turgenev
  - A Month in the Country (1955 TV play), a 1955 television adaptation of the 1872 play
  - A Month in the Country (ballet), 1976 choreographed by Frederick Ashton, based on Turgenev's play
- A Month in the Country (novel), 1980 by J. L. Carr
  - A Month in the Country (film), 1987 directed by Pat O'Connor, based on Carr's novel
