= St Materiana's Church, Tintagel =

Church in Cornwall

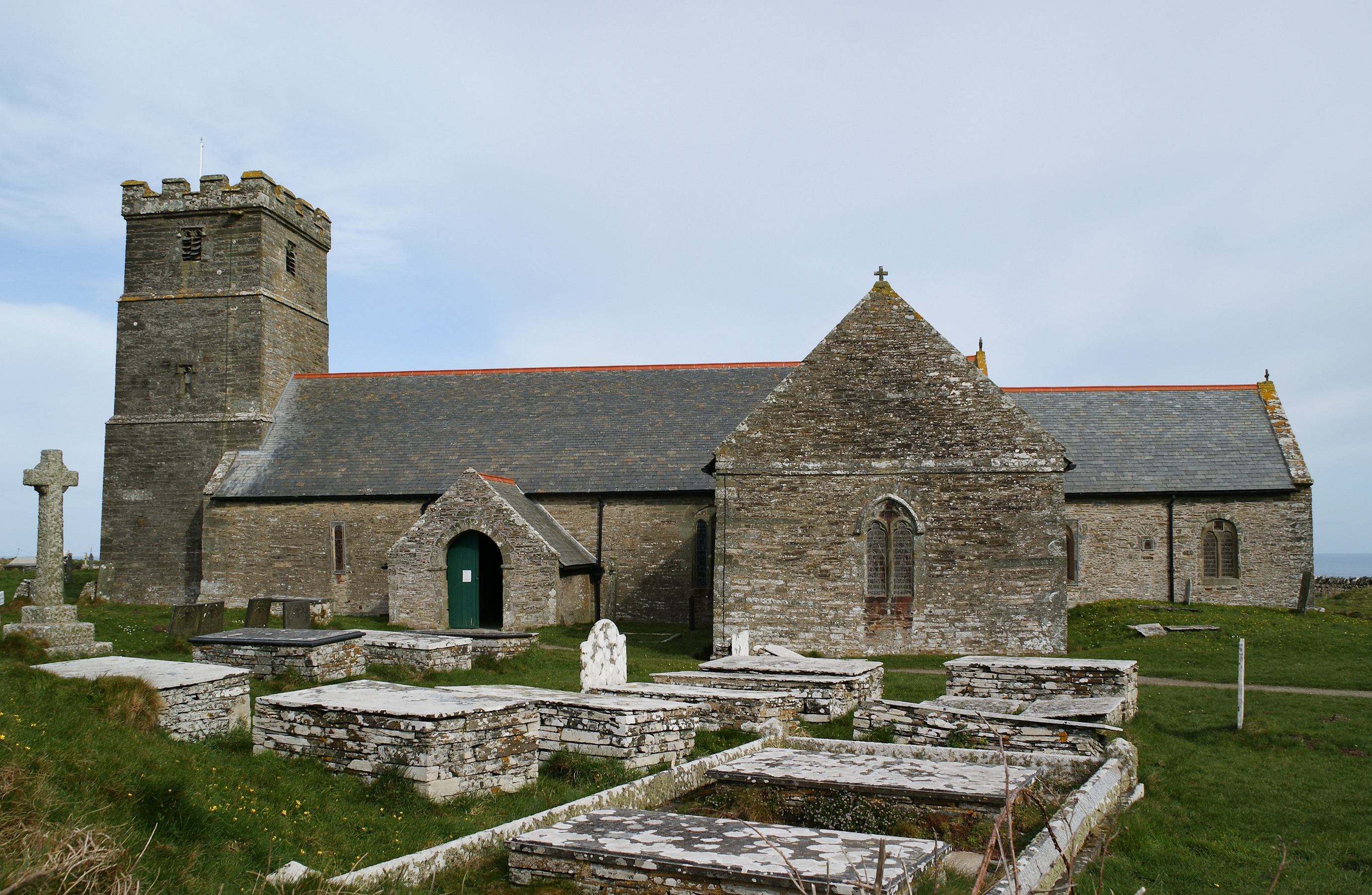
- Tintagel Parish Church
- St Materiana's Church, Tintagel
- 50.6630°N 4.7597°W
- Denomination: Church of England
- Churchmanship: High Church
- Website: www.achurchnearyou.com

History
- Dedication: St Materiana

Administration
- Province: Canterbury
- Diocese: Truro
- Archdeaconry: Bodmin
- Deanery: Stratton
- Parish: Tintagel
- Location within Cornwall

Listed Building – Grade I
- Official name: Church of St Materiana
- Designated: 17 December 1962
- Reference no.: 1327752

The Parish Church of Saint Materiana at Tintagel is a Church of England parish church in the Church of England Diocese of Truro in Cornwall, England, UK. It stands on the cliffs between Trevena and Tintagel Castle and is listed Grade I.

The first church on the site was probably erected in the 6th century, founded as a daughter church of Minster: these are the only churches dedicated to the saint and though she is usually identified with Madryn, Princess of Gwent, it has also been suggested that the dedication could refer to Saint Marcellina, sister of Saint Ambrose.

== Present building ==
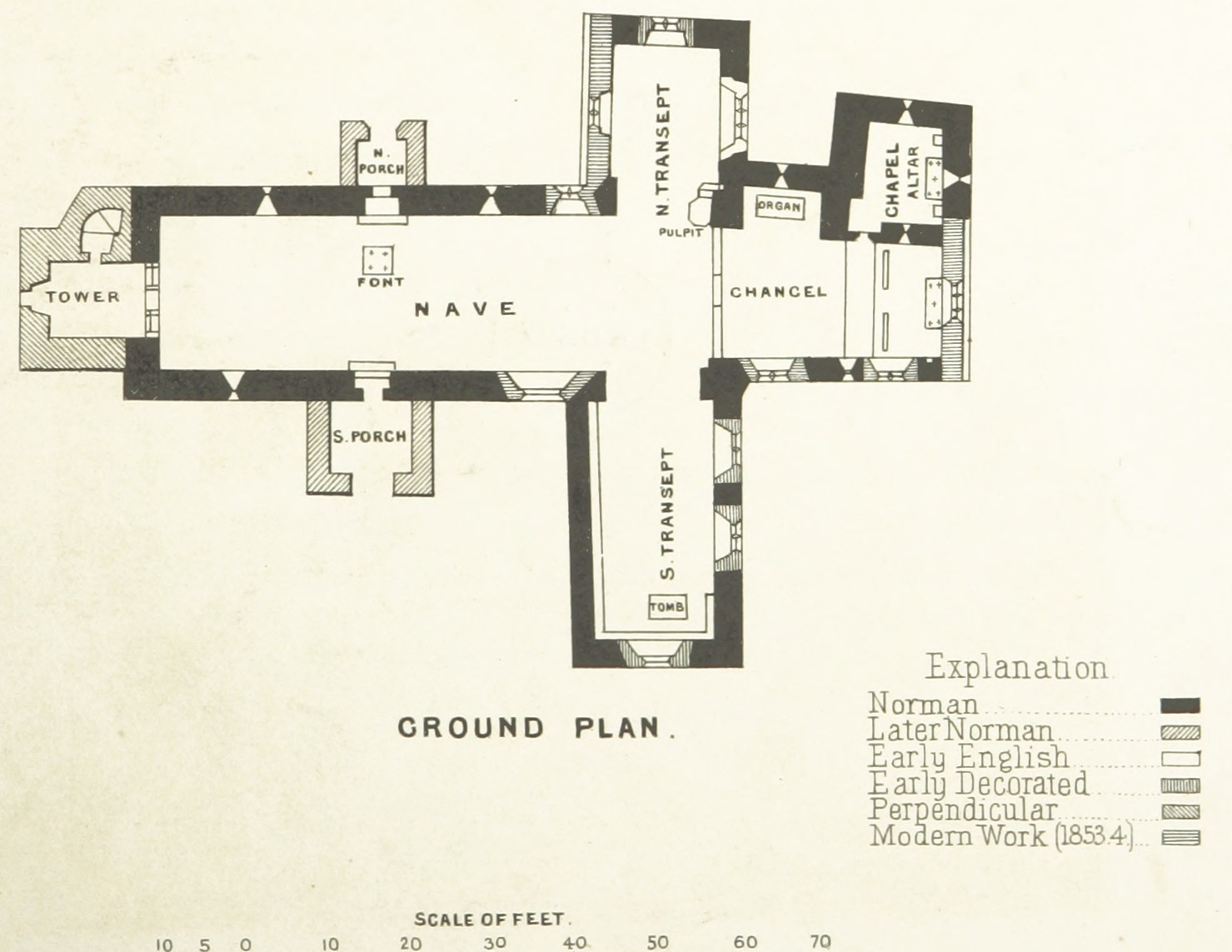
The floor plan

The existing church may have been created in the late 11th or early 12th century. Art historian Nikolaus Pevsner (writing in 1950) suggested that its Norman-era design includes some Saxon features, while the tower may be 13th or 15th century in date. The most significant change in its design was the restoration in 1870 by Piers St Aubyn which included a new roof. Later changes include moving the pipe organ (twice) and a number of new stained glass windows: many of these portray saints, including St Materiana, St George and St Piran. There are three modern copies of Old Master paintings, and a Roman milestone bearing the name of the Emperor Licinius (d. 324). The tower has a peal of six bells, ranging in date from 1735 to 1945. As of 2016 an electric organ is used instead of the pipe organ.

=== Nave ===
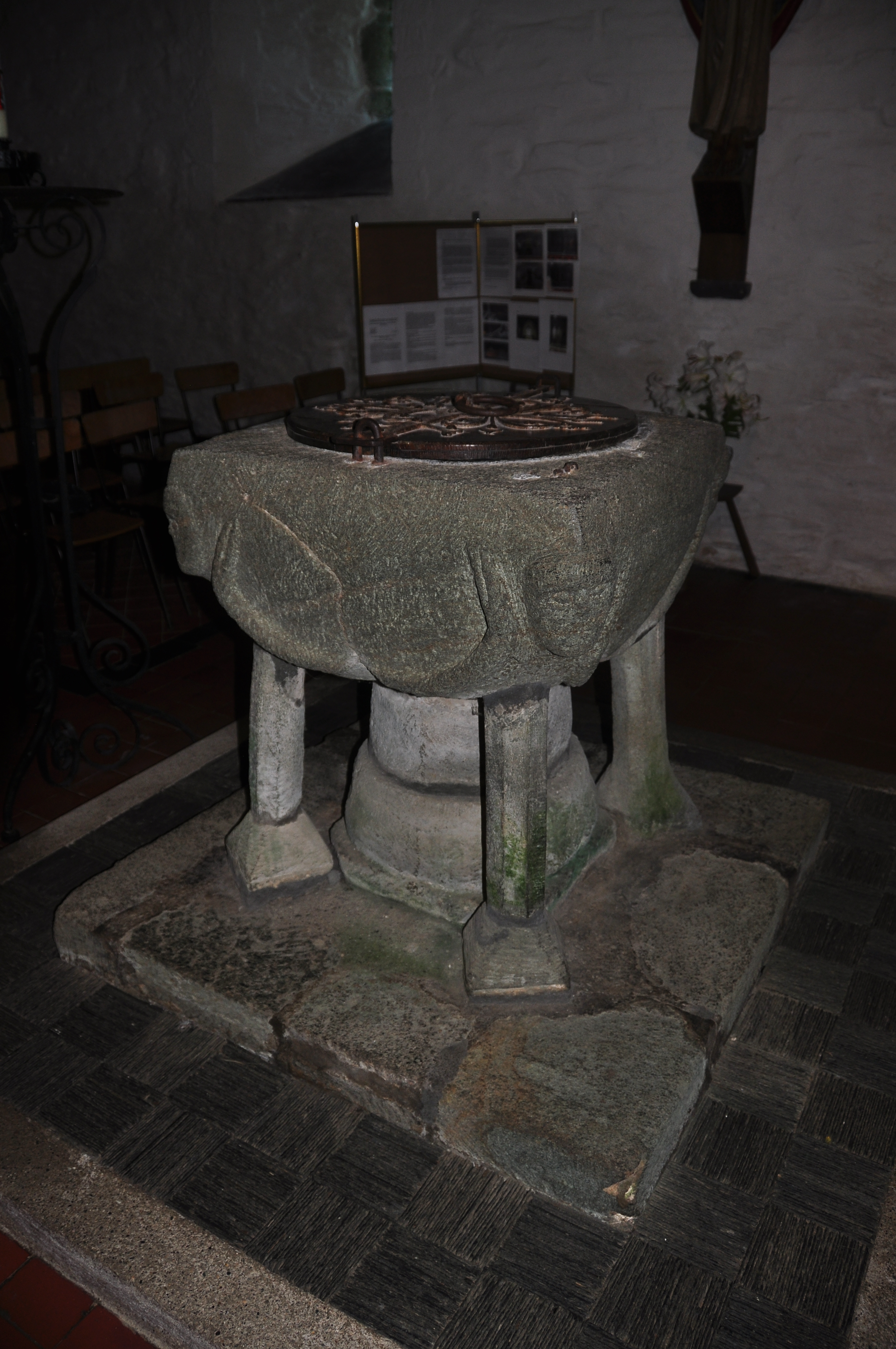
The Norman font

Both north and south doorways are Norman, the north cruder and perhaps earlier than the south. The north porch is probably 14th century and the south porch a later rebuilding of a 13th-century porch. The font is Norman, rather crudely carved in elvan: each of the four faces is carved with snakes and each corner with a head. Three of the windows are Norman: the largest of the others portrays St George. The walls of the central tower space (between the transepts) were planned to support a tower but this was either never built or afterwards removed as unsafe. The stone coffin lid may commemorate a priest and is of the late 13th century.

=== Chancel ===
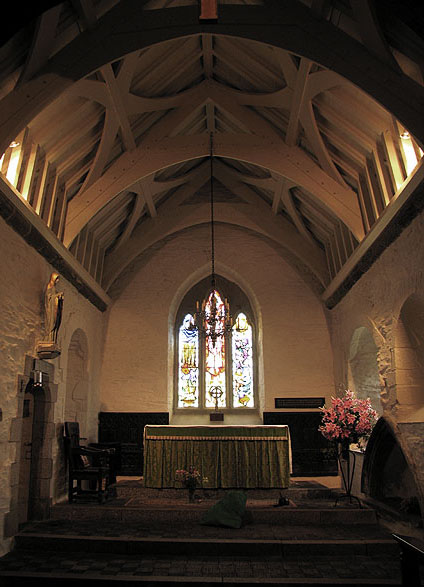
The church's chancel

The rood screen (which would have had access to the loft on the south side) is of the 15th century but the canopy has been removed, probably at the Reformation. The recess in the south wall is known as the Founder's Tomb and is probably of the 14th century. The east window which is recent is a memorial to Fr. Canner, vicar 1950–1976. On the north wall is a statue of the patron saint in memory of Parson Chapman, vicar 1894–1916. The chapel on the north side of the chancel is the old Lady Chapel, which is very hard to date: though it must be later than the chancel it contains a mediaeval stone altar. The recess on the north side was formerly the site of the organ but has more recently been used as a vestry.

=== Transepts ===
The altar in the north transept is modern and was originally dedicated to All Saints but it is now generally known by the name of St Symphorian from the window behind it. Symphorian, contrary to tradition, is portrayed as a bishop, and his supposed connection with this area seems to be a mistake made by John Leland in writing about the churches of Forrabury and Tintagel. The north window commemorates John Douglas Cook, editor of the Saturday Review, who is buried in the churchyard nearby.

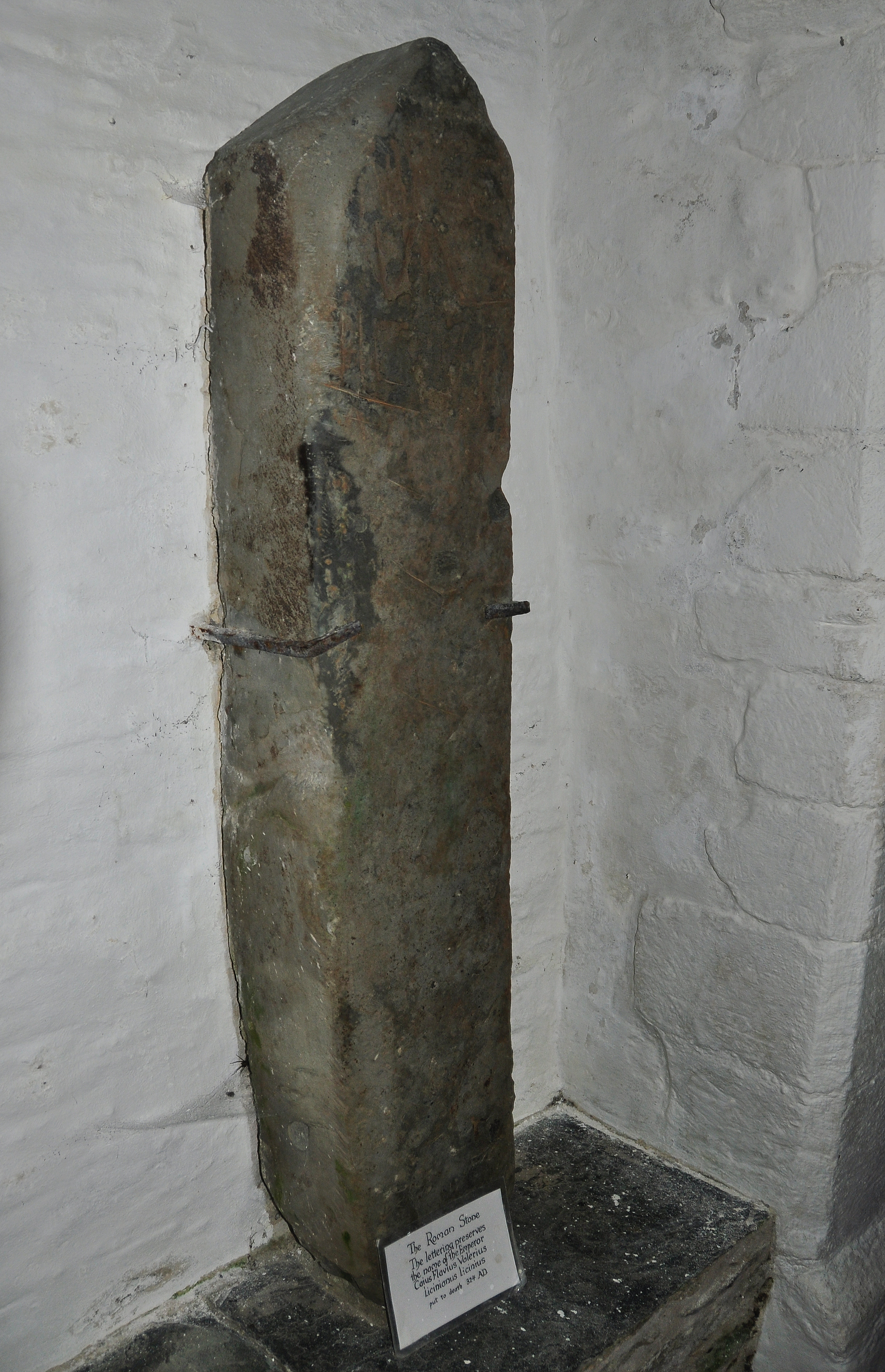
The Roman inscribed stone in the south transept

The south transept is somewhat longer than the north and may have been lengthened to contain a tomb. A stone bench runs round part of the walls from the time when no other seating was provided in churches. The Roman inscribed stone is of the early 4th century and was found built into the western gateway of the churchyard in 1889; it bears the name of the Emperor Licinius (d. 324). The memorial brass is for Joan (d. 1430s?), mother of John Kelly who was vicar here 1407-1427 and afterwards dean of Crantock. Originally placed under the altar, it was moved to the end of the transept in 1871.

=== Tower ===
The tower at the west end was built in the 14th century and battlements were added in the 15th. The five older bells are dated 1735, 1785, 1828, and two 1868: the sixth was added in 1945. The tenor bell weighs 7-0-10. The west window has modern armorial stained glass depicting coats of arms connected with the history of this parish.

== Churchyard ==
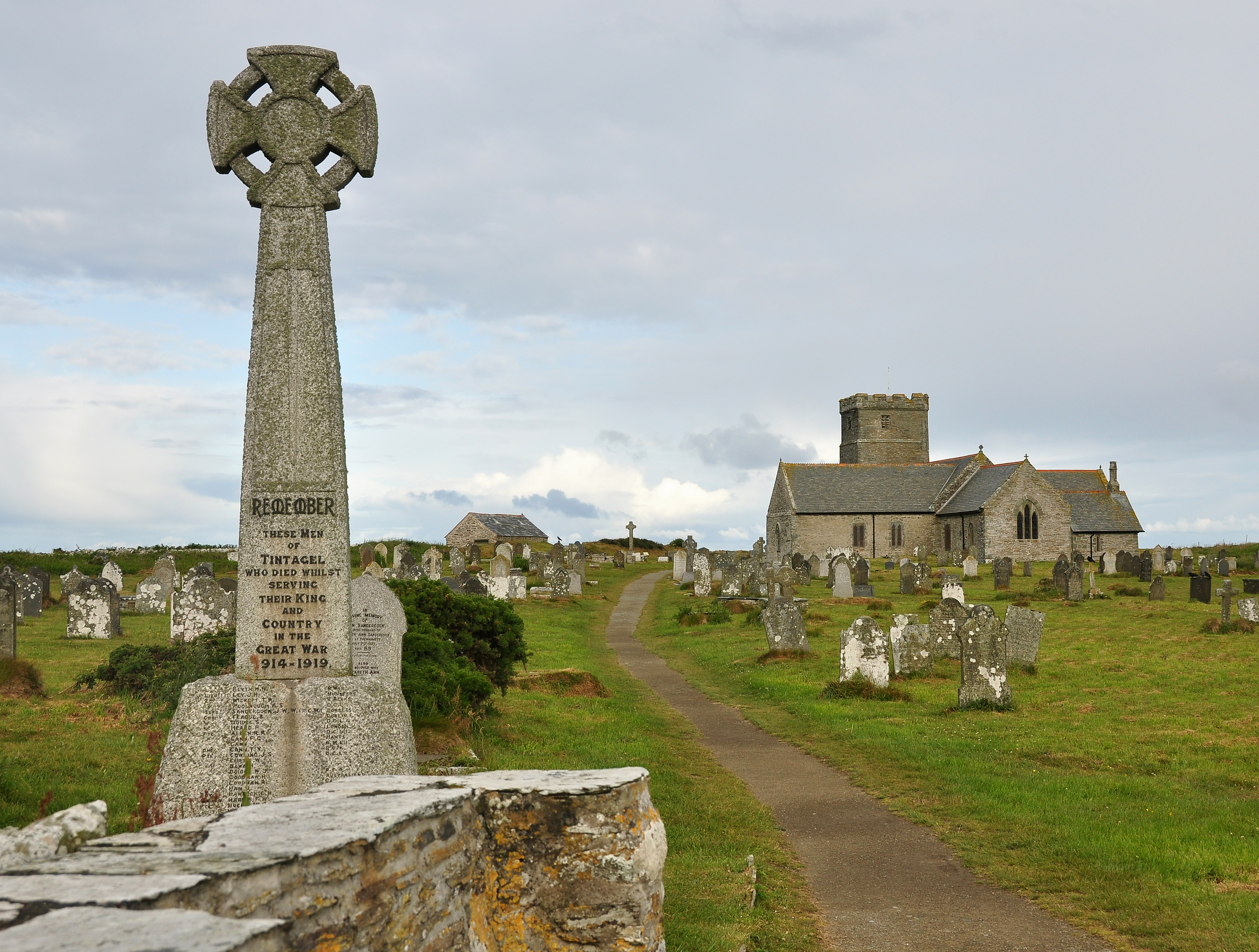
War memorial at the church

This is unusually large for a churchyard in Cornwall though it has apparently been extended three times. To the east of the older part (which is approximately circular in shape) are areas which came into use probably in the early 19th and mid-20th centuries. The north-east part was previously part of the Trecarne Lands. The churchyard cross and the war memorial are both modern and formed of granite. All the pre-Victorian gravestones are of local slate: the earliest of them are between 1690 and 1710. There were excavations here in 1990 and 1991 (north-west of the church).

The most interesting memorials are the tomb of John Douglas Cook, founder editor of the Saturday Review (d. 1868) north-west of the church, and the wooden cross over the grave of Domenico Catanese (d. 1893) to the east. (On 20 December 1893 at Lye Rock the barque Iota was driven against the cliff. The crew were able to get onto the rock and apart from a youth of 14 were saved: his grave is marked by a wooden cross (the name is given in the official Italian usage, surname first: Catanese Domenico, on a lifebuoy).

The jacket illustration for J. L. Carr's A Month in the Country shows Tintagel Parish Church whereas the story is set in Yorkshire. The grave outside the churchyard wall was suggested by Tintagel where a number of early graves were encountered in ploughing Trecarne Lands and excavated in 1956. They were dated most probably between 500 and 1000 AD by the county archaeologist.

== Parish registers ==
The parish registers begin for burials in 1546, for baptisms in 1569 and for marriages in 1588. (Register entries up to 1668 were all written by a single scribe copying the previous records.)

== Vicars ==
The earliest recorded vicar was Gervase de Truueru in 1259; the longest serving Gerance Davye, 1581–1629; and the second longest Richard Byrn Kinsman, 1851–1894. The patrons of the benefice since 1534 have been the Dean and Canons of Windsor. The patronage belonged in the 13th and 14th centuries to the French abbey at Fontevrault (now known as Fontevraud-l'Abbaye) in Anjou.

- Gervase de Truueru 1259-1276
- Roger de Hemptone 1276-c. 1306
- Martyn Skynard c. 1306-1321
- Hamund de Alternon 1321-1339
- Peter de Sulihulle 1339-1349
- Ralph Trevyseke 1349-1362
- Reginald Revel 1362-c. 1380
- Stephen Goof c. 1380-1400
- Peter Rous 1400-1407
- John Kelly 1407-1427 (afterwards dean of Crantock)
- Stephen Tremenhir 1427-1451
- John Gregory 1451-1477
- Nicholas Hawke 1477-1498
- Richard Lucas 1498-1534
- Robert Lee 1534-1542
- John Skelborne 1542-1564
- Anthony Belye 1564-1581
- Gerance Davye 1581-1629
- Matthew Sweetser 1629-1668
- Sylvester Sweetser 1668-1684
- John Gill 1684-1692
- Christopher Chilcott 1692-1726
- Edward Stephens 1726-1737
- Jonathan Baron 1737-1755
- James Evans 1755-1770
- Arthur Wade 1770-1810
- Charles Dayman 1810-1835
- Robert Stapylton Bree 1835-1851
- Richard Byrn Kinsman 1851-1894 (also honorary constable of the castle and prebendary of Exeter)
- Arthur Grieg Chapman 1894-1917
- Arthur George Melville Rushton 1917-1919
- Charles Albert Treherne 1919-1920
- Archibald Blissard Blissard-Barnes 1920-1938 (the vicarage coach-house was converted into Fontevrault Chapel in 1925)
- Edward Dudbridge Arundell 1938-1945
- Denys Hewett Street 1945-1950
- Arthur Cuthbert Canner 1950-1976 (also curate 1941 - 1945)
- Ivan Henry Gregory S.S.C. 1977-1994
- Robin Thomas (priest in charge) 1994-1998
- David John Rake (priest in charge) 1998-2008
- John Barfoot (priest in charge) 2008–2013
- Michael Parsons / Robert S. Thewsey Rector 2013-2017
- Heather Jane Aston (priest in charge) 2017-2024
- Simon George Faulks (Rector) 2025-present

== Parish status ==
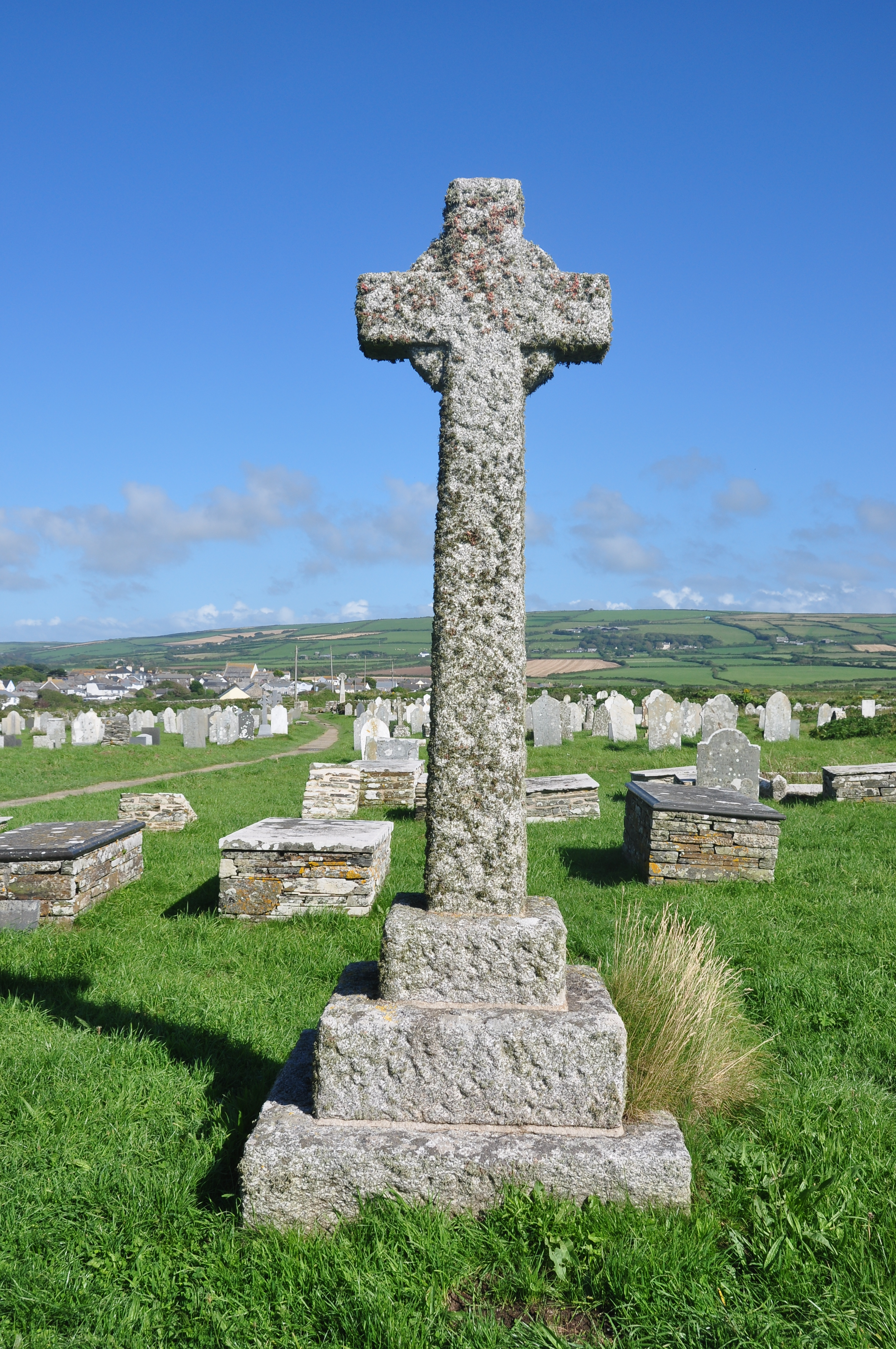
The churchyard looking towards Condolden with the modern churchyard cross

The church is in the Boscastle and Tintagel group of parishes which includes:

- St Symphorian's Church, Forrabury
- St Merteriana's Church, Minster
- St Michael and All Angels' Church, Lesnewth
- St Denis' Church, Otterham
- St Julitta's Church, St Juliot
- The Holy Family Church, Treknow
- St Piran's Church, Trethevy
- St Petroc's Church, Trevalga

The parish was until recent times in the deanery of Trigg Minor, then in that of Trigg Minor and Bodmin but now in the Stratton deanery.

== Bibliography ==
- Canner, A. C. (1953) The Ancient Parish Church of Tintagel: a new guide. Tintagel: [P. C. C.] (There are many later editions.)
