= How Steeple Sinderby Wanderers Won the F.A. Cup =

1975 novel by J.L. Carr

- Cover of first edition - 1975
- Author: J.L. Carr
- Language: English
- Genre: Comic Fiction
- Publisher: London Magazine Editions
- Publication date: 1975
- Publication place: United Kingdom
- Media type: Print (Hardback)
- Pages: 124
- ISBN: 978-0-900847-94-3
- OCLC: 30547312
- Preceded by: The Harpole Report
- Followed by: A Month in the Country (book)

How Steeple Sinderby Wanderers Won the F.A. Cup is the fourth novel by J. L. Carr, published in 1975. The novel is a comic fantasy that describes in the form of an official history how a village football club progressed through the FA Cup to beat Rangers in the final at Wembley Stadium.

Like all of Carr's novels, it is grounded in his own experience. In 1930 as an unqualified 18-year-old teacher he played a season for South Milford White Rose when they won a football knockout tournament. It sold 2,124 copies. Carr bought back the rights to the novel in 1992 and reprinted it in an edition of 2,000 copies as the fourth novel published by his own imprint, The Quince Tree Press.

== Adaptations ==
The novel has been dramatised several times by different playwrights. In 1991, it was adapted as a play for eight actors and was performed at the Worcester Swan Theatre, the Leatherhead Thorndike Theatre and the Mermaid Theatre, London where it ran for six weeks, with Simon Coates as Joe Gidner. More recently it was dramatised by Brian Wright for performance by an amateur youth theatre, with a cast of sixty, in Northamptonshire.

The play was performed at the Edinburgh Festival Fringe in August 2011 by one actor, Mark Jardine of Lichfield Garrick Theatre Repertory Company, who provided all the voices and characterisations. In this version the beaten finalists were Wolverhampton Wanderers.

== Publishing history ==
- 1975 London Magazine Editions, ISBN 0-904388-02-6
- 1986 Grafton Books, ISBN 0-586-06358-7
- 1992 The Quince Tree Press, ISBN 0-900847-94-8
- 1999 Prion Humour Classics, Prion Books, ISBN 1-85375-363-7
- 2003 The Quince Tree Press, ISBN 0-900847-94-8
- 2016 Penguin Modern Classics, ISBN 978-0241252345. Reissued 7 April 2016.

=== Translations ===
- 2008 Come gli S.S. Wanderers vinsero la coppa d’Inghilterra, Fazi Editore, Roma, ISBN 88-8112-892-6
- 2017 Wie die Steeple Sinderby Wanderers den Pokal holten, DuMont Buchverlag, Koln. Translated by Monika Köpfer. ISBN 978-3-8321-9854-1
- 2018 Cómo llegamos a la final de Wembley, Tusquets Editores S.A., Spain, ISBN 978-8-4906-6480-3
