= Dudley Training College for Teachers =

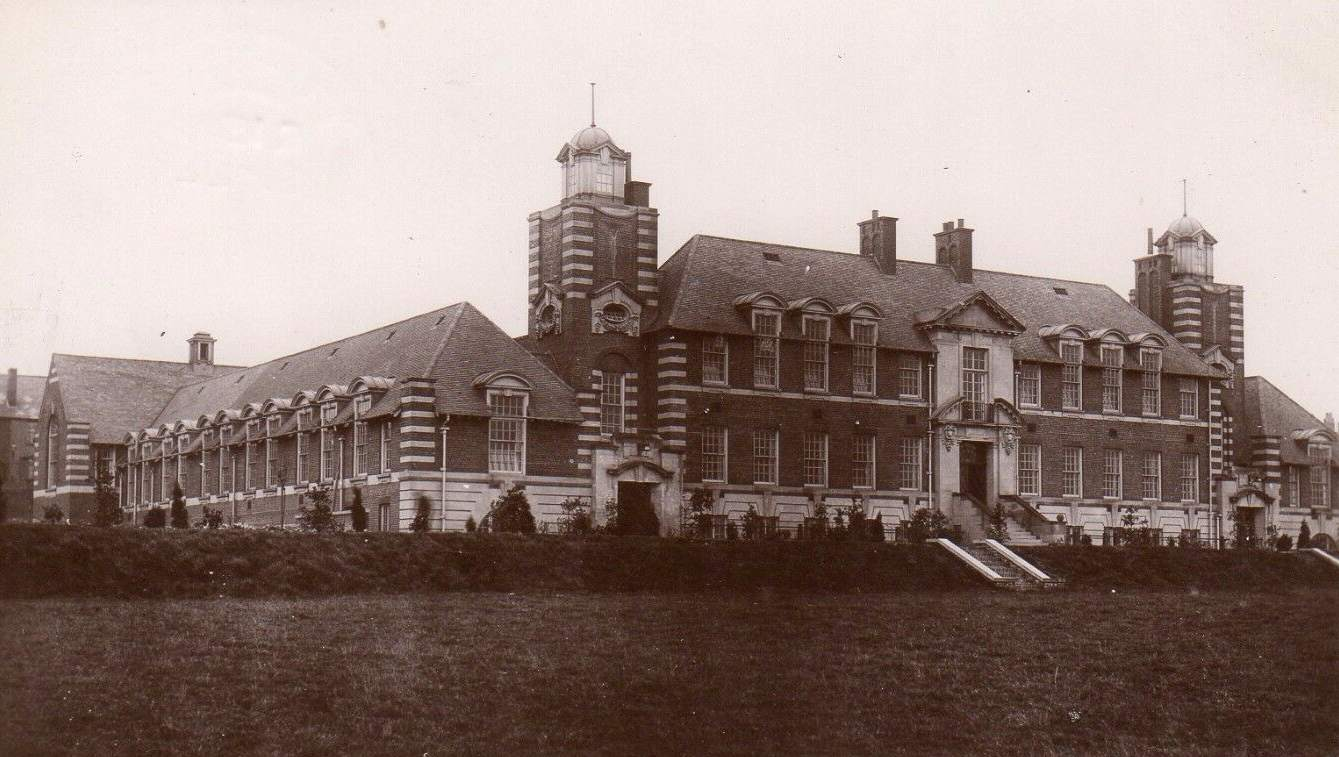
Dudley Training College for Teachers, now demolished

Dudley Training College for Teachers (Men and Women), later renamed Dudley College of Education, existed for 68 years in Dudley, a town once in Worcestershire, now in the West Midlands. The college opened in 1909. It was taken over by Wolverhampton Polytechnic in 1977. The college's grand Edwardian building was demolished in 2002, 93 years after it had been built.

== History ==
Dudley Training College for Teachers was built on 8 acres of land on Eve Hill. The land was bought in 1908 by the County Borough of Dudley from the Earl of Dudley for £8,000. The main college building was designed by a firm of architects named Crouch, Butler & Savage and was built at a cost of £10,799. The site of the new college faced King Edmund Street in Dudley and the entrance was reached up Castle View, which is about a kilometre from Dudley Castle and had no view of it. There were sports fields behind the main building. The college was opened on 16 July 1909 by the President of the Board of Education, Walter Runciman.

The college initially had two students' hostels: the North Hostel, which provided accommodation for 50 female students and was situated within the college grounds, and The Mount, which accommodated 21 male students nearby, at Dixon's Green. Male students who were unable to live at home or in the Hostel, lived in rooms, which were supervised by the college. In the early 1930s the college taught 150 students a year.

In the 1930s the college offered a Certificate of Education after two years’ training, which was examined by the University of Birmingham and Midland Training Colleges Joint Board.

By 1950 the college had become a constituent of the Institute of Education of Birmingham University. In 1965 the college was renamed Dudley College of Education, a period when it trained over 600 students a year, its heyday. In 1977 the college was taken over by Wolverhampton Polytechnic, now the University of Wolverhampton, so Dudley Training College for Teachers disappeared in name. In June 2002 the college building was sold and demolished to be replaced by houses while the two halls of residence were purchased by Dudley College of Technology, which now occupies part of the site. Only the sports fields now remain.

== College Principals ==
- Ivor John (1909–1913)
- Joseph Makepeace Forster (1913- 194?)
- David A. Jordan (194? – 1965)
- Dennis Broadhurst (1965 - ?)

== Notable alumni ==
J.L. Carr (1931–33), teacher, publisher and author.
