= The Harpole Report =

1972 novel by J.L. Carr

- Dust jacket of first edition - 1972
- Author: J.L. Carr
- Language: English
- Genre: Fiction
- Publisher: Secker and Warburg
- Publication date: 1972
- Publication place: United Kingdom
- Media type: Print (Hardback)
- Pages: 164
- ISBN: 978-0-436-08610-6
- OCLC: 641281
- Dewey Decimal: 823/.9/14
- LC Class: PZ4.C3118 Har PR6053.A694
- Preceded by: A Season in Sinji
- Followed by: How Steeple Sinderby Wanderers Won the F.A. Cup

The Harpole Report is the third novel by J. L. Carr, published in 1972. The novel tells the story mostly in the form of a school logbook kept by George Harpole, temporary Head Teacher of the Church of England primary school of "Tampling St. Nicholas". The novel has attained a minor cult status within the teaching profession. The characters George Harpole and Emma Foxberrow reappear in Carr's eighth and final novel, Harpole & Foxberrow General Publishers and more briefly, What Hetty Did.

Like all of Carr's novels, it is grounded in personal experience. Carr was a primary school teacher for almost 40 years, including 15 years spent as Head Teacher of Highfields school in Kettering. Carr described it as "an evangelical tract that got away". The novel is now published by The Quince Tree Press, which was established by Carr in 1966 to publish his illustrated maps and small books.

== Characters ==
- Mr James Albert Pintle; "one of the old school", who insists on imposing on his pupils antiquated maths problems about coal deliveries.
- Mrs Rita Grindle-Jones; prim and proper advocate of lower middle-class respectability, who has "never been spoken to like this in all my thirty years' experience". Harpole replies "You have not had thirty years' experience. You have had one year's experience thirty times."
- Mr Croser: young, cocky teacher whom Harpole dislikes.
- Miss Grace Tollemache; spinster from prominent local family, who regards all her hopes as buried since she was condemned to teach "The Backwards" class.
- Miss Emma Foxberrow; attractive blonde Cambridge graduate and feminist, under whose influence Harpole gradually changes from a buttoned-up typically "English" admirer of Sir Henry Newbolt to a crusading maverick.
- Mr Edwin Theaker; caretaker, intent on building his private administrative empire.
- The Widmerpools; the local problem family, with innumerable and determinedly illiterate children.
- Mr Tusker; bureaucrat, determined to frustrate any new initiative
- Councillor Mrs Blossom; libidinous mayoral candidate, who engineers disciplinary proceedings against Harpole when he rejects her advances.
- Alderman Tollemache; Grace's father, eccentric member of local education authority with a private vendetta against "percussion" who acts as deus ex machina in the disciplinary proceedings.

== Reviews ==
Frank Muir described The Harpole Report as "the funniest and perhaps the truest story about running a school that I ever have read" and chose it as his book to take to a desert island on the BBC Radio 4 programme Desert Island Discs.

The Times described it as "An assortment of memorable characters lurking in the English educational undergrowth."

== Publication history ==
- 1972 Secker and Warburg, ISBN 0-436-08610-7
- 1973 Quartet Books, ISBN 0-7043-1052-X
- 1984 Penguin Books, ISBN 0-14-006920-8
- 2003 The Quince Tree Press, ISBN 1-904016-06-5

== Translation ==
- 2022 Die Lehren des Schuldirektors George Harpole, Dumont Buchverlag (German) ISBN 3832165509

== Broadcasts ==
An abridged version of the book was broadcast on BBC Radio 4 in 1981, read by Martin Jarvis. It was again dramatised by Jonathan Smith for Radio 4 in 2012.
