= A Season in Sinji =

1967 novel by J. L. Carr

- Dust jacket of first edition – 1967
- Author: J. L. Carr
- Language: English
- Genre: Fiction
- Publisher: Alan Ross
- Publication date: 1967
- Publication place: United Kingdom
- Media type: Print (Hardback)
- Pages: 192
- ISBN: 0-7043-1098-8
- OCLC: 16288780
- Preceded by: A Day in Summer
- Followed by: The Harpole Report

A Season in Sinji is the second novel by J. L. Carr, published in 1967. The novel is set mostly at fictional RAF Sinji in west Africa during the Second World War and features a bizarre cricket match.

Like all of Carr's novels it contains a strong element of personal experience: Carr worked as a photography technician in the Royal Air Force during World War II, posted initially in 1942 to No. 270 Squadron at RAF Jui in Sierra Leone in west Africa, and he was a keen cricketer. In an interview with Vogue magazine in 1986, Carr described this novel as his "best one" and "a novel written with passion". The publishers paid an advance of £125. The novel is now published by The Quince Tree Press, which was established by Carr in 1966 to publish his illustrated maps and small books.

== Publication history ==
- 1967 Alan Ross Limited
- 1976 Quartet Books ISBN 0-7043-1098-8
- 1985 Penguin Books ISBN 0-14-006919-4
- 2003 Quince Tree Press ISBN 1-904016-08-1
