= The Battle of Pollocks Crossing =

1985 novel by J. L. Carr

- Dust jacket of first edition – 1985
- Author: J. L. Carr
- Language: English
- Genre: Fiction
- Publisher: Viking Penguin
- Publication date: 1985
- Publication place: United Kingdom
- Media type: Print (Hardback)
- Pages: 176
- ISBN: 0-670-80559-9
- OCLC: 54742057
- Preceded by: A Month in the Country (book)
- Followed by: What Hetty Did

The Battle of Pollocks Crossing is the sixth novel by J.L. Carr, published in 1985. The novel was shortlisted for the Booker Prize in 1985 and followed a nomination in 1980 for A Month in the Country, his preceding novel.

The novel describes a year spent by a young English exchange teacher named George Gidner in the fictional town of Palisades on the Great Plains of South Dakota in the months leading up to the Wall Street crash. Like many of Carr's novels it is grounded in personal experience: Carr worked for a year as an exchange teacher in Huron, South Dakota in 1938–1939 and returned again to teach in 1956–1957. Carr also reported that it was his first novel, but the book failed initially to find a publisher. When it had been accepted by Viking Penguin, Carr took it back and spent two days rewriting it. The early titles of the novel were apparently Oh, My America, a quotation from John Donne and To the West, To the West, an immigrant song, although Carr may not have been entirely serious. When the novel was published Carr issued a small 16-page companion volume called Gidner's Brief Lives of the Frontier, a dictionary of people who had lived and died between 1810 and 1890 to the east of the Mississippi river.

Carr bought back the rights to the novel and published it in 1993 in an edition of 2,000 copies as the fourth title from his Quince Tree Press, who still publish it.

== Publishing history ==
- 1985 Viking Penguin, ISBN 9780670805594
- 1986 Penguin Books, ISBN 9780140077988
- 1993 The Quince Tree Press, ISBN 9780900847967

=== Translations ===
- 1987 De slag bij Pollocks Crossing, Veen, Utrecht, Netherlands, ISBN 9789020422344
- 1991 La bataille de Pollocks Crossing, Actes Sud, France. Translated by Pierre Girard. ISBN 9782868696397
