= A Month in the Country (novel) =

1980 novel by J. L. Carr

- Dust jacket of first edition – 1980
- Author: J. L. Carr
- Language: English
- Genre: Fiction
- Publisher: Harvester Press
- Publication date: 1980
- Publication place: United Kingdom
- Media type: Print (hardback)
- Pages: 111
- ISBN: 978-0-85527-328-6
- OCLC: 7168346
- Dewey Decimal: 823/.914 19
- LC Class: PR6053.A694 M6
- Preceded by: How Steeple Sinderby Wanderers Won the F.A. Cup
- Followed by: The Battle of Pollocks Crossing

A Month in the Country is the fifth novel by J. L. Carr, first published in 1980 and nominated for the Booker Prize. The book won the Guardian Fiction Prize in 1980.

== Plot ==
The plot concerns Tom Birkin, an ex-serviceman of the First World War, who is employed to uncover a mural in a village church that was thought to exist under coats of whitewash. Another former soldier is employed to look for a grave beyond the churchyard walls. Though Birkin is an unbeliever, there is prevalent religious symbolism throughout the book, mainly dealing with judgement. The novel explores themes of England's loss of spirituality after the war and of happiness, melancholy and nostalgia as Birkin recalls the summer uncovering the mural, when he healed from his wartime experiences and a broken marriage.

== Critical reception ==
In an essay for Open Letters Monthly, Ingrid Norton praised the novel's subtlety,

The happiness depicted in A Month in the Country is wise and wary, aware of its temporality. When he arrives in Oxgodby, Birkin knows very well life is not all ease and intimacy, long summer days with "winter always loitering around the corner". He has experienced emotional cruelty in his failed marriage. As a soldier, he witnessed death: destruction and unending mud; the edges are brighter for it. Birkin's idyll in the country is brought into relief by what Birkin has gone through in the past and the disappointments that, it is implied, await him. Carr's great art is to make it clear that joy is inseparable from the pain and oblivion which unmake it.

== Background ==
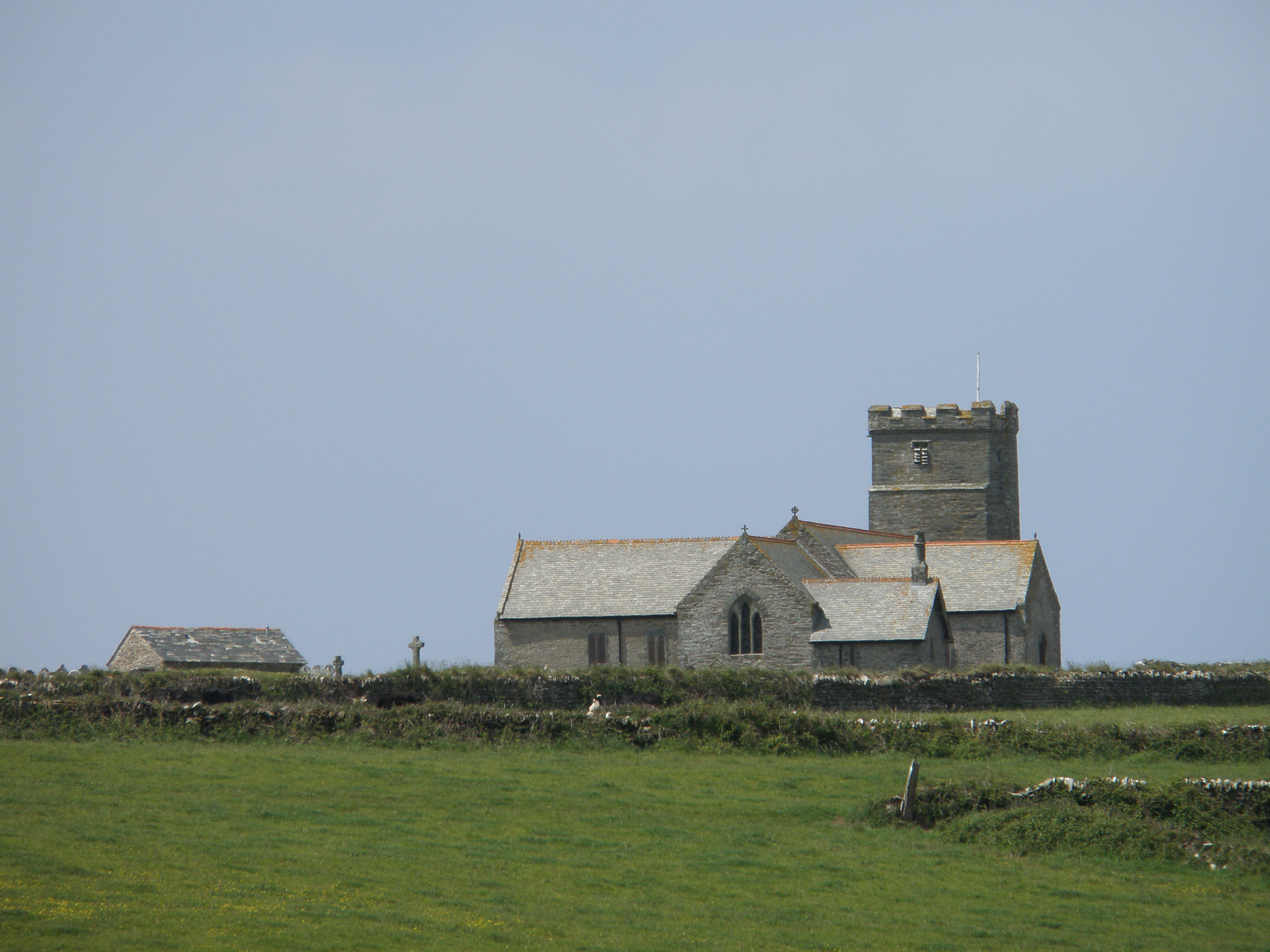
St Materiana's Church, Tintagel seen on one version of the book's jacket

Many of the incidents in the novel are based on real events in Carr's own life, and some of the characters are modelled on his family. One version of the jacket illustration shows Tintagel Parish Church in Cornwall, but the story is set in Yorkshire. The grave outside the churchyard wall was suggested by Tintagel, where a number of early graves were encountered at Trecarne Lands and excavated. The text finishes with the words "Stocken, Presteigne, 1978". Although the book is set in North Yorkshire, Carr wrote early drafts while staying in his caravan in the top orchard at Stocken Farm, just outside Presteigne in Powys, Wales.

== Dramatisation ==
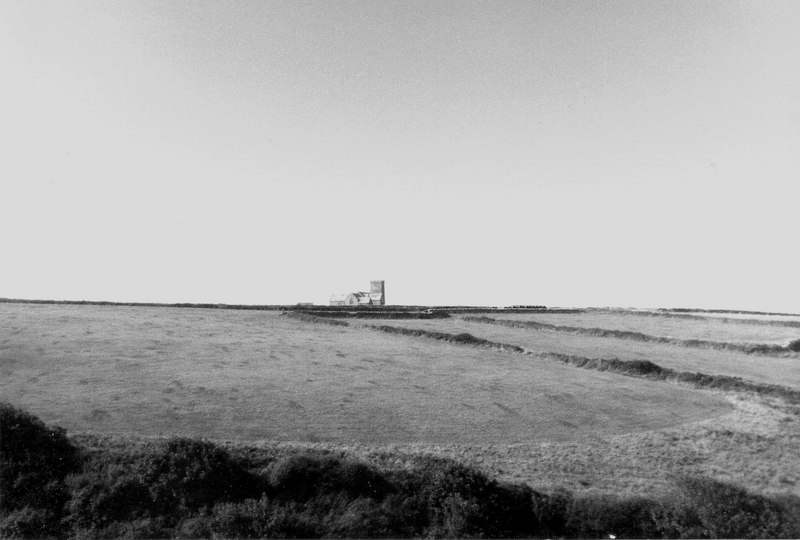
Trecarne Lands

With a screenplay by Simon Gray, the novel was made into a 1987 film, directed by Pat O'Connor and starring Colin Firth, Kenneth Branagh, Natasha Richardson and Patrick Malahide.

A radio adaptation of the book, adapted by Dave Sheasby, was first broadcast on the BBC Radio 4 Saturday Play in November 2010 and repeated in May 2012.
