= A Day in Summer =

1963 novel by J. L. Carr

- Dust jacket of first edition - 1963
- Author: J. L. Carr
- Language: English
- Genre: Fiction
- Published: 1963 (Barrie and Rockliff)
- Publication place: United Kingdom
- Media type: Print (Hardback)
- Pages: 219
- Followed by: A Season in Sinji

A Day in Summer is the first novel by J. L. Carr, published in 1963. It is the story of an RAF veteran named Peplow who arrives in the fictional village of Great Minden on the day of its annual Feast (or fair), seeking retribution for the death of his son.

Carr started the novel as a part of written work for classes of the Workers' Educational Association and described it as his most technically ambitious novel, so it was "foolhardy to start with". Carr sent duplicate copies of the novel to publishers to consider, and it was accepted by both the seventh and eighth publishers he sent it to at the same time. The eventual publisher paid Carr an advance of 50 pounds for the novel.

The novel has been reissued by The Quince Tree Press, the company established by Carr to publish his maps and small books.

A TV film version was made in 1989, directed by Bob Mahoney from a screenplay by Alan Plater, and starring Peter Egan, Jack Shepherd, John Sessions, Jill Bennett, Ian Carmichael and Daragh O'Malley.

== Publication history ==
- 1963 Barrie and Rockliff
- 1973 Quartet Books, ISBN 9780704310667
- 1986 The Hogarth Press, ISBN 9780701206468
- 2003 The Quince Tree Press, ISBN 9781904016076

=== Translations ===
- 1967 Kermis van de dood (Village Fair of Death), Het Spectrum, Utrecht. Translated by G. Seuter-Ellis
- 1990 Um dia no Verão, Gradiva, (Portuguese), ISBN 9789726621539
- 1994 Un jour en été, Actes Sud, (French), ISBN 9782742702060
- 2008 Kermis van de dood (Village Fair of Death), Prisma-Boeken, Utrecht/Antwerp, (Dutch), ISBN 90-315-0450-5
- 2018 Ein Tag im Sommer, Dumont Buchverlag, (German), ISBN 9783832198893
