= J. L. Carr =

English novelist

- Born: Joseph Lloyd Carr; 20 May 1912; Carlton Miniott, North Riding of Yorkshire, England
- Died: 26 February 1994 (aged 81); Kettering, Northamptonshire, England
- Education: Castleford Secondary School, Dudley Training College for Teachers
- Occupations: Teacher, publisher, author
- Spouse: Sally Sexton (1918–1981)
- Children: Robert Carr
- Writing career
- Notable work: A Month in the Country

Joseph Lloyd Carr (20 May 1912 – 26 February 1994), known as "Jim" or "James", was an English novelist (his most notable novel being A Month in the Country), cartographer, lexicographer, publisher, and teacher.

== Biography ==
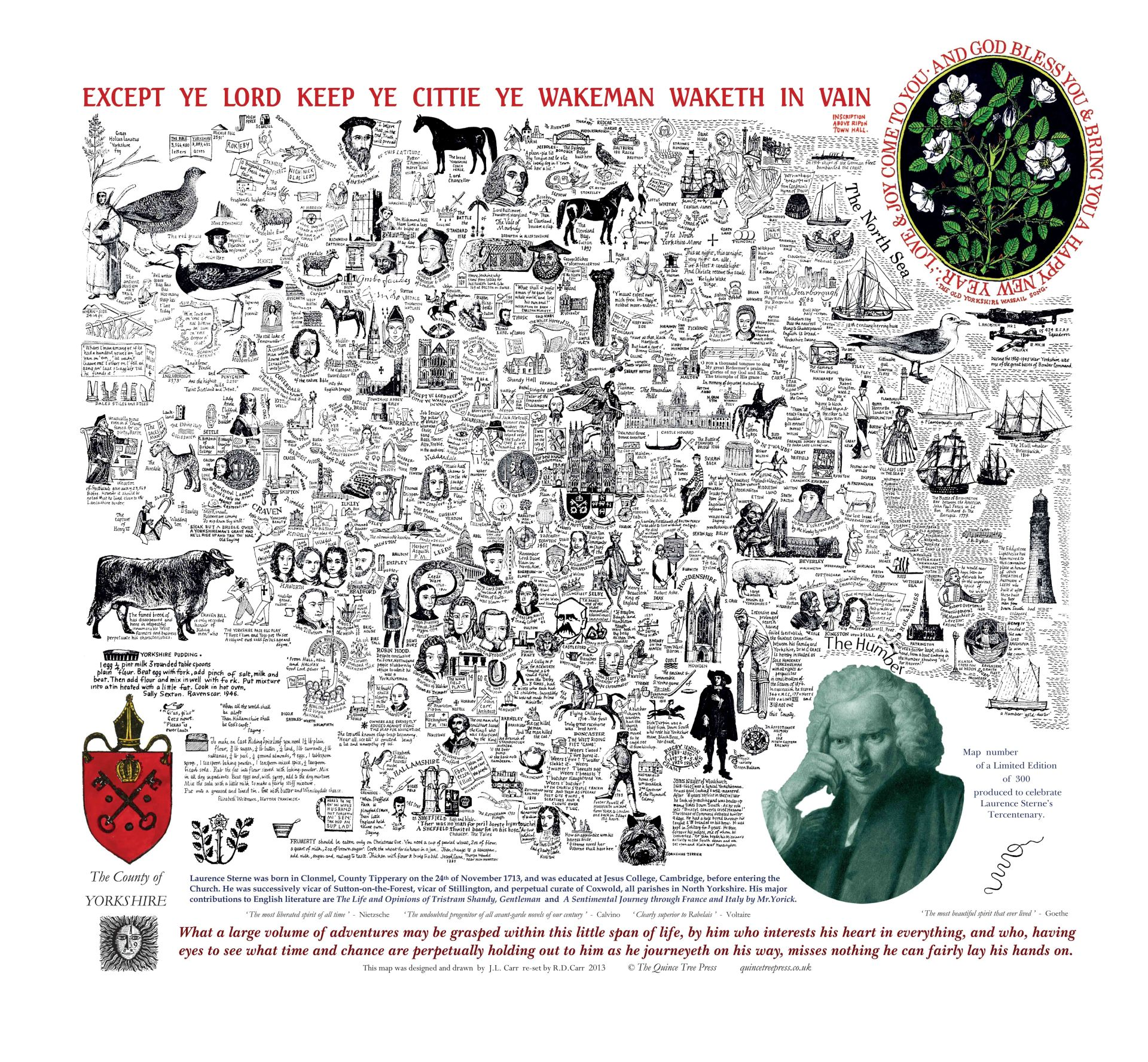
A literary map of Yorkshire by Carr

Carr was born in Carlton Miniott in the North Riding of Yorkshire, next to Thirsk railway station, into a Wesleyan Methodist family. His father Joseph, the eldest of 12 children of a tenant farmer, went to work for the railways, eventually becoming a station master then traffic controller for the North Eastern Railway. Carr was given the same Christian name as his father and the middle name Lloyd, after David Lloyd George, the Liberal Chancellor of the Exchequer and subsequent Prime Minister. He adopted the names Jim and James in adulthood. His brother Raymond, who was also a station master, and other members of his family called him Lloyd.

Carr attended the village school at Carlton Miniott, where there was an innovative headmaster named James Milner, but when the family moved to Sherburn-in-Elmet when he was about 9 years old, the school in the village was poorly run and he learned little. Carr failed the county examination to gain entry to Tadcaster Grammar School, so at the age of 13 his parents enrolled him at Castleford Secondary School as a fee-paying student. After passing his school certificate examination he stayed on for a year in the sixth form and applied for admission to a teachers' training college, because the local authority would pay his fees. However, when he was interviewed at Goldsmiths' College, London, he was asked why he wanted to be a teacher. Carr answered: "Because it leaves so much time for other pursuits." He was not accepted. Over forty years later, after his novel The Harpole Report had become a critical and popular success, he was invited to give a talk at Goldsmiths'. He replied that the college had had its chance of being addressed by him.

He worked for a school year in 1930–31 as a supernumerary teacher at South Milford Primary School, where he played football for South Milford White Rose, a team which got to the semi-final of the Barkston Ash District FA Challenge Cup and won the Barkston Ash District FA Junior Cup. In the 1931–32 season, he was part of the South Milford team that won the Barkston Ash District FA Templenewsam Cup, Deighton Shield and Lane Fox Supplementary Cup. He developed this experience into his novel How Steeple Sinderby Wanderers Won the F.A. Cup, taken to an extreme as the title implies. He then successfully applied to Dudley Training College for Teachers and graduated after two years in 1933 with a Certificate in Education. Carr spent his first two years as a teacher at a school in Bitterne, Hampshire before returning to the Midlands to teach in Birmingham. In 1938 he spent a school year as an exchange teacher in Huron, South Dakota, in the Great Plains. Much of the year was a struggle to survive in a strangely different culture; his British salary converted into dollars was pitifully inadequate to meet the American cost of living. This experience gave rise to his novel The Battle of Pollocks Crossing.

After his year in the United States, Carr travelled back to England across the Pacific, visiting Japan, China, Malaya (now Malaysia), Burma (now Myanmar), India and Iraq, where he learned that war had been declared, so he hastened back to England, arriving home in September 1939. He volunteered for service in the Royal Air Force in October 1940. After spending a year in a salvage unit in Devon, he was trained as an aerial photography technician at RAF Farnborough and was posted to West Africa, where he served at RAF bases in Sierra Leone, Nigeria and the Gambia, experiences that he used in A Season in Sinji. He was commissioned as an officer in October 1943 and served as an intelligence officer for squadrons at RAF bases in Kent, Norfolk and Scotland, experiences that he used in his novel A Day in Summer.

In March 1945 he married Sally (Hilda Gladys Sexton), a Red Cross nurse, and after leaving the RAF in about January 1946 and taking three months' demobilisation leave, he returned to teaching in Birmingham. In 1951 he was appointed headmaster of Highfields Primary School in Kettering, Northamptonshire, a post he held from 1952 to 1967. He returned to Huron, South Dakota, in 1956 to teach again at the same school for a school year, and wrote and published himself a social history of The Old Timers of Beadle County based on the records of the County Historical Society which he had attended in 1938.

Although Carr was raised in a Wesleyan Methodist household, he later converted to Anglicanism, motivated more by his appreciation for church architecture and atmosphere than by doctrine.

In 1967, having written two novels, he retired from teaching to devote himself to publishing and writing. He produced and published from his own house a series of small books designed to fit into a pocket. Some of them were selections from the works of English poets, while others were brief monographs about historical events or works of reference. To encourage children to read each of these small books was given two prices, the lower of which applied only to children. As a result, Carr received several letters from adults using childish writing in an attempt to secure the discount.

He also carried on a campaign with his wife, Sally, to preserve and restore the redundant parish church of St Faith at Newton in the Willows, which had been vandalised and was threatened with demolition. Carr came into conflict with the vicar of the benefice and the higher church authorities in his campaign. The building was saved, but was converted into a scientific study centre. It is now closed.

In 1986 Carr was interviewed by Vogue magazine and, as a writer of dictionaries, was asked for a dictionary definition of himself. He answered: "James Lloyd Carr, a back-bedroom publisher of large maps and small books who, in old age, unexpectedly wrote six novels, which, although highly thought of by a small band of literary supporters and by himself, were properly disregarded by the Literary World".

Carr died of leukaemia in Kettering on 26 February 1994, aged 81.

== Works ==
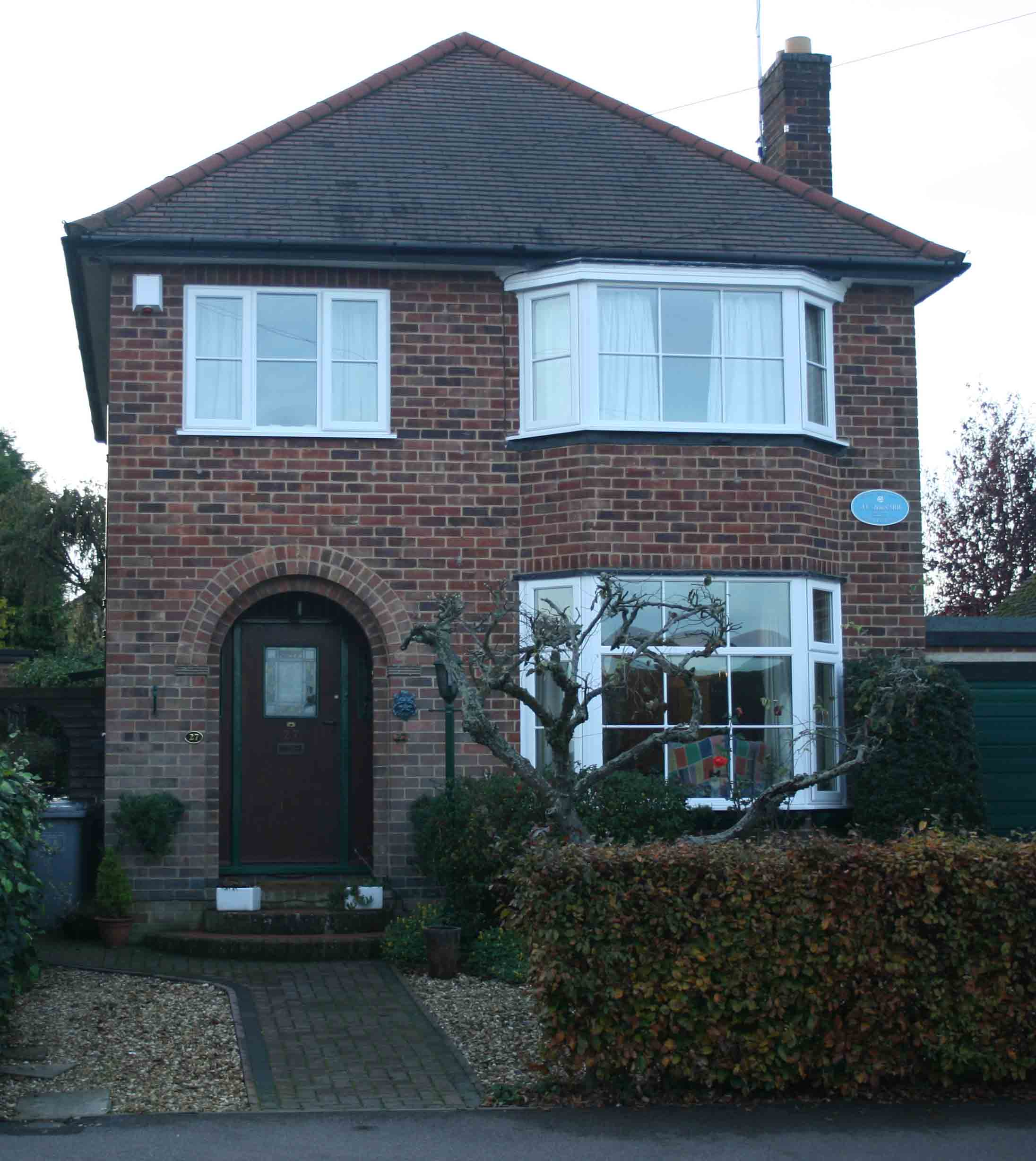
The house in Kettering where J. L. Carr established The Quince Tree Press, a name that was not used on any publication until Carr published What Hetty Did in 1988.

When Carr gave up teaching in 1967 his aim was to try to make his living by publishing small books and a series of maps of English counties to be read and discussed, rather than to provide navigational information. These he published himself under the imprint The Quince Tree Press. The original printing plates from several of his maps were mounted on sheets of plywood and used by Carr as stepping stones in his garden. The garden also contained statues he had carved himself, many of which had mirrors set into the stone at such angles that the sun shone through the windows on his birthday.

Carr wrote eight short novels that contain elements of comedy and fantasy, as well as darker passages, based on his varied experiences of life as teacher, traveller, cricketer, footballer, publisher and restorer of English heritage. Six of the eight were published by different publishers, but he published the last two himself through the Quince Tree Press. Many of the characters and incidents, and even much of the dialogue, are drawn from life.

His novel A Month in the Country was nominated for the Booker Prize in 1980, when it won the Guardian Fiction Prize. In 1985 he was shortlisted again for the Booker Prize for The Battle of Pollocks Crossing.

Two of his novels have been filmed: A Month in the Country (1987) and A Day in Summer (1989).

Carr wrote several non-fiction works and published them at his Quince Tree Press. They include a dictionary of cricketers, a dictionary of parsons, and dictionaries of English kings and queens. He also provided the text for several school textbooks published by Macmillan Publishers and Longman, and designed to develop children's English language skills.

== Novels ==
- A Day in Summer (1963). London: Barrie and Rockliff.
- A Season in Sinji (1967). London: Alan Ross.
- The Harpole Report (1972). London: Secker & Warburg. ISBN 0-436-08610-7
- How Steeple Sinderby Wanderers Won the F.A. Cup (1975). London: London Magazine Editions. ISBN 0-904388-02-6
- A Month in the Country (1980). Brighton, Sussex: The Harvester Press. ISBN 0-85527-328-3
- The Battle of Pollocks Crossing (1985). London: Viking. ISBN 0-670-80559-9
- What Hetty Did (1988). Kettering: The Quince Tree Press. ISBN 0-900847-91-3
- Harpole & Foxberrow General Publishers (1992). Kettering: The Quince Tree Press. ISBN 0-900847-93-X

== Social history ==
- The Old Timers: A Social History of the Homesteading Pioneers in the Prairie States During the First Few Years of Settlement, as Shown by a Typical Community, the "Old-Timers" of Beadle County in South Dakota (1957). Huron, South Dakota: privately printed.

== Children's language books ==
- (1970). The Red Windcheater, Nippers series. Illustrated by George Adamson. London: Macmillan. ISBN 0-333-01789-7
- (1972). The Garage Mechanic, What Do They Do? series. Illustrated by Chris Mayger. London: Macmillan. ISBN 0-333-12064-7
- (1972). The Dustman, What Do They Do? series. Illustrated by Michael Shoebridge. London: Macmillan. ISBN 0-333-12276-3
- (1974). The Old Farm Cart, Language in Action series, Level 3. Illustrated by Richard Butler. London: Macmillan. ISBN 0-333-16601-9
- (1974). Red Foal's Coat, Language in Action series, Level 2. Illustrated by Susan Richards. London: Macmillan. ISBN 0-333-16595-0
- (1976). An Ear-ring for Anna Beer, Language in Action series, Level 3. Illustrated by Trevor Ridley. London: Macmillan. ISBN 0-333-19954-5
- (1976). The Green Children of the Woods, Whizz Bang series. Illustrated by Bill Sanderson. London: Longman. ISBN 0-582-19326-5
- (1980). Gone with the Whirlwind, Language in Action series, Level 4. Illustrated by Ken Evans. London: Macmillan. ISBN 0-333-28389-9

== Dictionaries ==
- (1977). Carr's Dictionary of Extra-ordinary English Cricketers. Kettering: The Quince Tree Press.
- (1977). Carr's Dictionary of English Queens, Kings' Wives, Celebrated Paramours, Handfast Spouses and Royal Changelings. Kettering: The Quince Tree Press.
- (1979?). Carr's Dictionary of English Kings, Consorts, Pretenders, Usurpers, Unnatural Claimants and Royal Athelings. Kettering: The Quince Tree Press.
- (198?). Welbourn's Dictionary of Prelates, Parsons, Vergers, Wardens, Sidesmen and Preachers, Sunday-school teachers, Hermits, Ecclesiastical Flower-arrangers, Fifth Monarchy Men and False Prophets. Kettering: The Quince Tree Press.
- (1983). Carr's Illustrated Dictionary of Extra-ordinary Cricketers. London: Quartet Books.
- (1985?). A Dictionary of Extraordinary English Cricketers Volume Two. Kettering: The Quince Tree Press.
- (1985). Gidner's Brief Lives of the Frontier. Kettering: The Quince Tree Press.

== Other writings ==
- (1981). The Poor Man's Guide to the Revolution of 1381. Kettering: The Quince Tree Press.
- (1981?) Forefathers. Kettering: The Quince Tree Press.
- (1982). "Justice Silence, now blind, wits wandering a little and very old, is visited by Sir John Falstaff's page, now a man, and asked for news of Francis Feeble, the woman's tailor, once unfairly conscripted for the army during rebellion." In Shakespeare Stories, ed. Giles Gordon. London: Hamish Hamilton, pages 82–90. ISBN 0-241-10879-9.
- (1987). An Inventory and History of The Quince Tree Press to Mark Its 21st Year and the Sale of Its 500,000th Small Book. August 1987. Kettering: The Quince Tree Press.
- (1990). "The First Saturday in May". In Fine Glances. A Connoisseur's Cricket Anthology, eds Tom Graveney, Mike Seabrook. London: Simon and Schuster, pages 21–25. ISBN 0-671-71025-7
- (1990). "Looking for Lord". In My Lord's. A Celebration of the World's Greatest Cricket Ground, ed. Tim Heald. London: Willow Books, HarperCollins, pages 15–19. ISBN 0-00-218363-3.
- (1990). Redundant Churches Fund. Churches in Retirement. A Gazetteer. London: Her Majesty's Stationery Office, foreword, pages ix–x. ISBN 0-11-701452-4
- (1993). "Cricket Books, 1992." In Wisden Cricketers' Almanack 1993, ed Matthew Engel. Guildford, Surrey: John Wisden, pages 1295 – 1306. ISBN 0-947766-20-0.
- (1994). Some Early Poems and Recent Drawings by J. L. Carr 1912–1994. Bury St Edmunds: The Quince Tree Press.

== Biography ==
- Byron Rogers (2003). The Last Englishman: A Biography of J. L. Carr. London: Aurum Press. ISBN 1-85410-838-7
- BBC (2025) Miles Jupp on JL Carr, author of A Month in the Country https://www.bbc.co.uk/programmes/m002hkqs (Accessed August 27, 2025)
