= Ian Stephens (artist) =

Australian artist

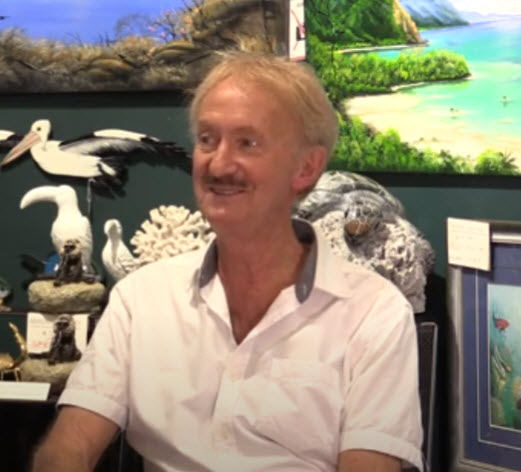
Ian Stephens during an interview on the Doc Dave show.

Ian Stephens is an artist, living in North Queensland, Australia.

Ian Stephens was born in the Gippsland region of Victoria and began drawing and painting at an early age. In 1971, Ian relocated to Melbourne to study fine art and painting techniques at the Victorian Artists Society. He completed advanced art courses and attained a Diploma of Commercial Art. In addition to this experience, Ian broadened his artistic knowledge by travelling Australia and the world.

Ian won the Royal Over-Seas League in 1976. His winning painting was sent to London to represent Australia in a Commonwealth exhibition opened by Queen Elizabeth II. The painting received High Commendation by the judges from the Royal Academy of Arts.

In 1992, Ian relocated to North Queensland to fulfil a lifelong ambition of living in the tropics. He enjoyed incorporating his new environment into his diverse range of landscapes.

Soon after relocating to North Queensland, Ian opened a gallery in Kuranda about 70km north of Cairns.

Ian sat for an interview with Doc Dave on 20 Feb 2020. "Doc Dave Interview"<https://www.youtube.com/watch?v=rdSQcEXo_4U>
