= Trethevy =

Hamlet in Cornwall, England

Coordinates: 50.6711°N 4.7238°W

Trethevy: Cornish: Tredhewi
- Location within Cornwall
- OS grid reference: SX076893
- Civil parish: Tintagel
- Unitary authority: Cornwall
- Ceremonial county: Cornwall
- Region: South West
- Country: England
- Sovereign state: United Kingdom
- Post town: TINTAGEL
- Postcode district: PL34
- Dialling code: 01840
- Police: Devon and Cornwall
- Fire: Cornwall
- Ambulance: South Western
- UK Parliament: North Cornwall

Trethevy (Cornish: Tredhewi) is a hamlet in north Cornwall, England, United Kingdom.

It is midway between the villages of Tintagel and Boscastle in the civil parish of Tintagel. Trethevy has a number of historic buildings and is an early Christian site. The hamlet is divided by the B3263 road which continues through Trevalga to Boscastle: the main settlement is south-east of the road and to the north-west is the Rocky Valley.

There are two other Trethevys in Cornwall. Trethevy in the parish of St Cleer (Trethewy, 1284) and Trethevy in South Petherwin parish (Trethewy, 1332). There are a further two places spelled Trethevey: Trethevey in St Mabyn parish (Tiwardeui, 1201) and Trethevey in Luxulyan (Trethewy, 1302). Additionally there are four places spelled Trethewey: Trethewey in Germoe (Trethewy, 1327), Trethewey in St Ervan (Trethewy, 1286), Trethewey in St Levan (Trethewy, 1320) and Trethewey in St Martin (Trethewy, 1371). All of these come from the Cornish Tredhewy meaning Dewi's Farm, apart from the one in St Mabyn which comes from Ty war Duwy meaning house on the river Dewey.

== History and antiquities ==
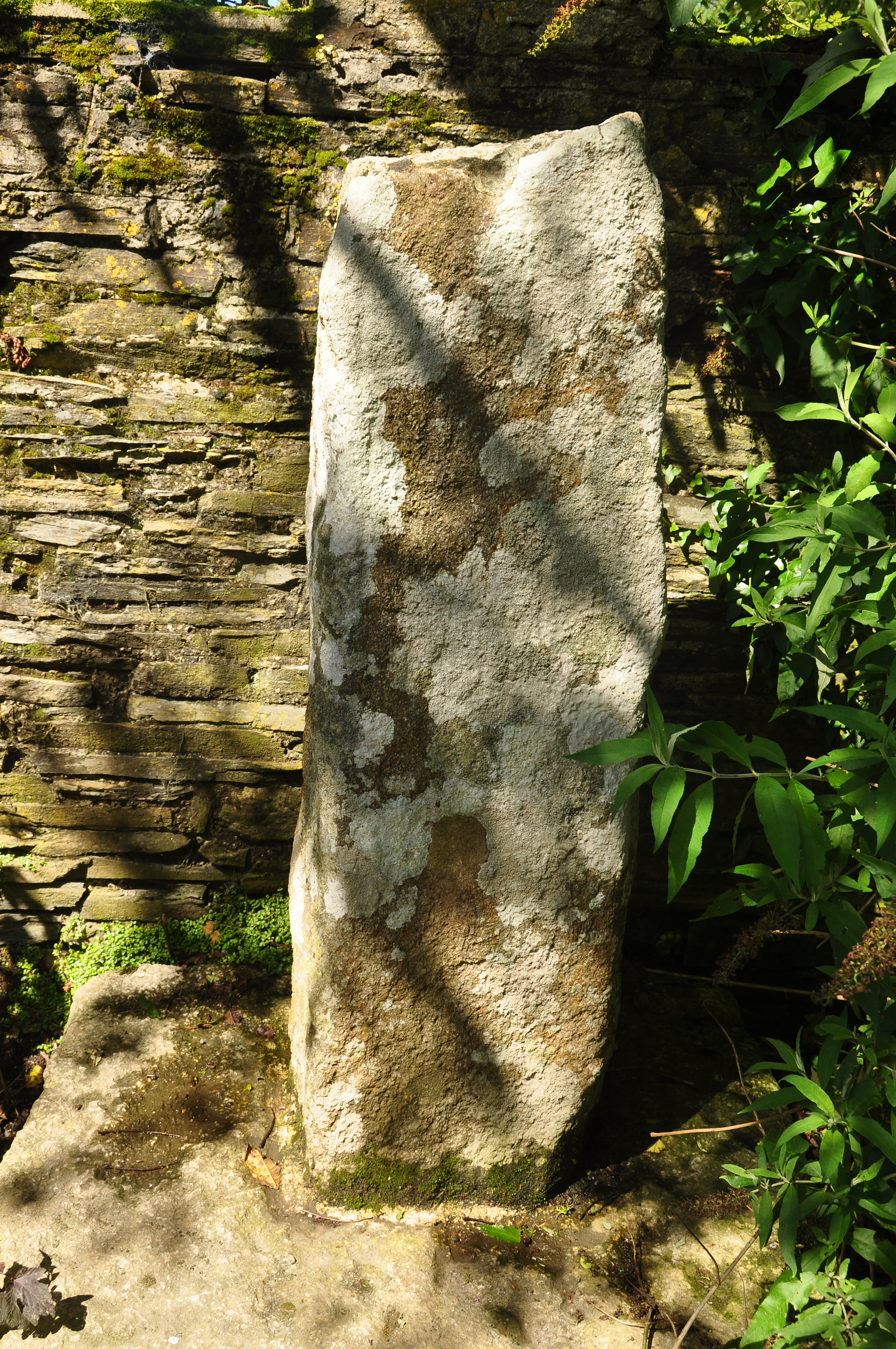
The Roman inscribed stone at Trethevy

Roman occupation of Trethevy is suggested by an inscribed granite pillar, once used as a gatepost and now situated on the roadside by St. Piran's, a reputed former monastery and now a private residence. (It was found in nearby Genver Lane in 1919.) The inscription on the stone reads C DOMI N GALLO ET VOLVS – 'For the Emperor Caesars our lords Gallus and Volusian.' Trebonianus Gallus and Antoninianus Volusianus reigned in the years 251–253. The pillar lends weight to the importance of the nearby trading post of Tintagel Island where merchants from as far away as the Mediterranean came to trade with the Cornish for their tin.

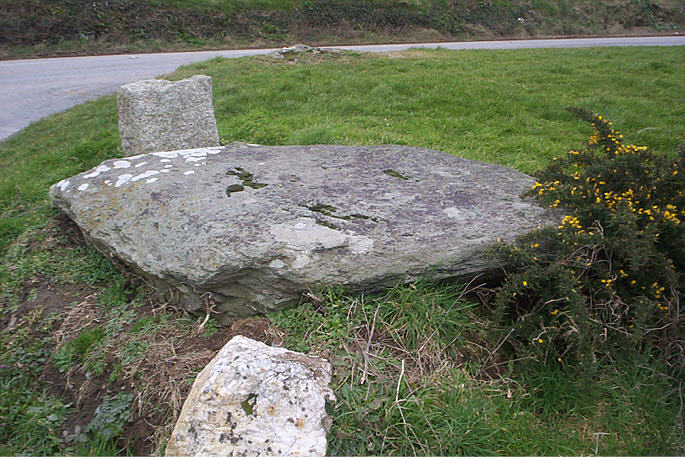
The prehistoric King Arthur's Quoit, beside the road to Trevalga

St Piran's was believed by former Tintagel vicar and historian, A. C. Canner, to have been the site of an early monastic settlement dating from the sixth century AD: in its present form it dates from the mid-16th century with medieval origins. The "monastery" tradition is likely to be an elaboration of William Goard based on R. S. Hawker's reference to "the reliques of a cell". George MacDonald in his Seaboard Parish (vol. 2, chapter 8) relates that Goard had given him a colourful account of the monks. Goard was resident at St Piran's and appointed himself the "Guide to St Nectan's Kieve Cascade".

Trethevy, Tregenver, Vowerland, Trewethett and Millcombe (i.e. Rocky Valley) were lands in this part of the parish and part of them was sold in 1538 by William Shytford to John Arscott for £100. For some 300 years the farmhouse of Trethevy was home to the family of Wade some of whom were mayors of the borough of Bossiney. Most of the farmhouse was demolished and replaced by a modern house which later became a hotel. William Wade and Stephen Wade were among those holding land in Trethevy and the other lands in 1808.

Sir John Maclean stated that Trethevy was at some time between the 16th and 19th centuries held by the family of Trefusis but without the date or other details. After 1822 it was bought by Sir John Yarde-Buller, and at a later date his grandson Lord Churston owned it. A fourth part of the estate at Trethevy belonged to George Smith (died 1652), of Lantewy and Lunna in St Neot, who was succeeded by his daughters Mary and Katherine. A settlement of the property on Mary's husband John Anstis and his heirs was made in 1668.

In the late 19th and early 20th centuries, a series of villas were built along the east side of the lane leading to St Nectan's Glen. The first of these was named after St Brychan and most of the subsequent villas were named after Brychan's children: St Endellion (Saint Endelienta), St Morwenna, St Mabyn and St Adwen. Another house named after a child of Brychan, St Yse (St Issey) was built on Genver Lane. More homes were built on the west side of the lane in the early 20th century and in the mid 20th century, residential development began on land to the east of the B3263. This area is known locally as 'the Bungalows'. To the west of the B3263, farmland was re-appropriated to create the Trewethett Farm Caravan Site.

== Christian heritage ==
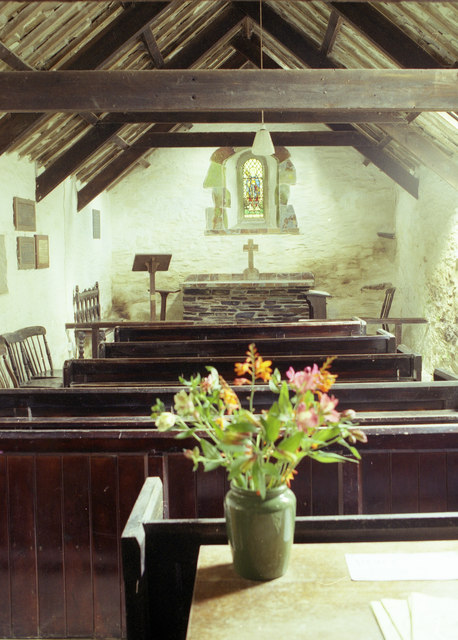
St Piran's Chapel

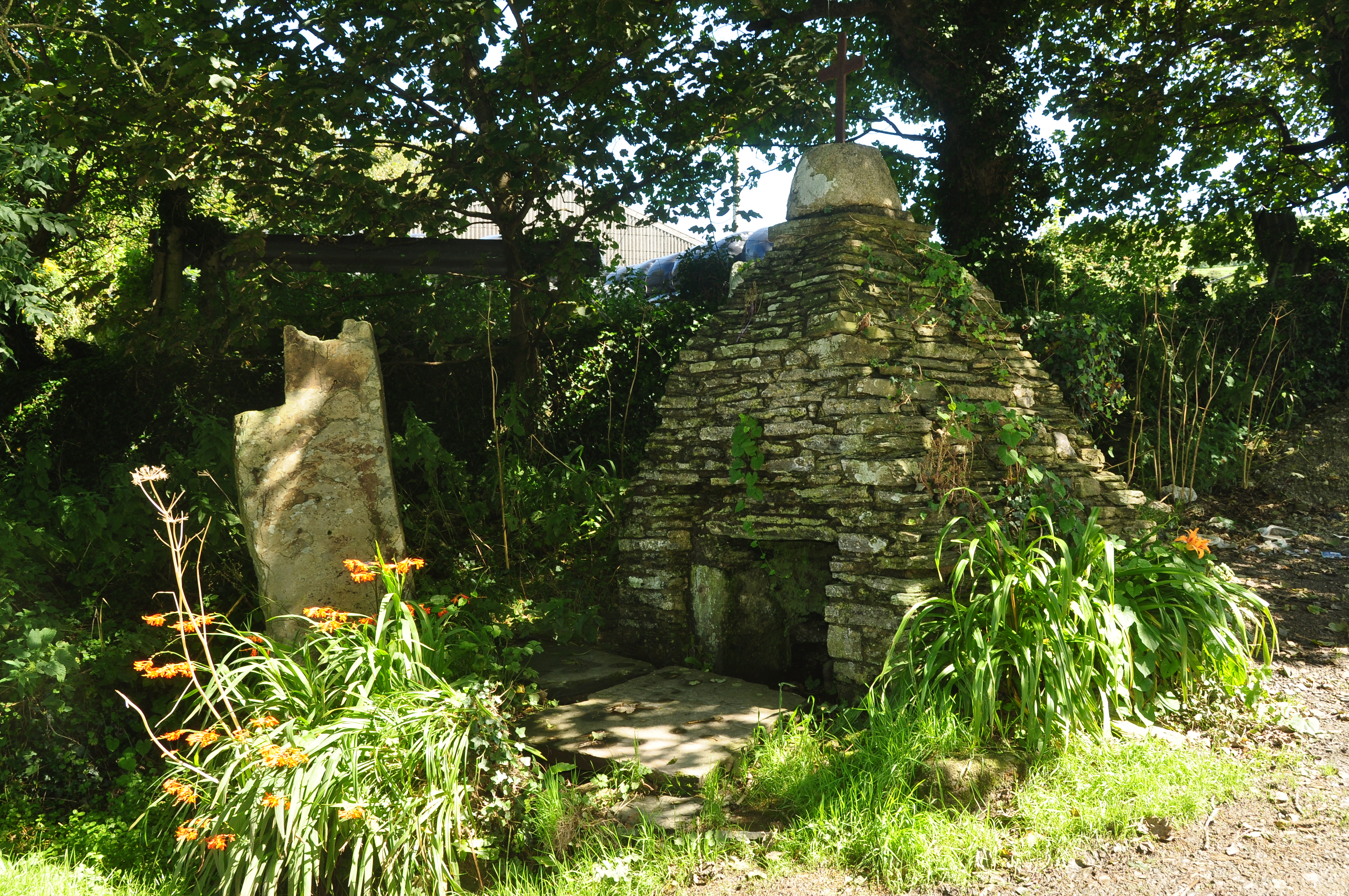
St Piran's Well

In the heart of Trethevy, surrounded by farm buildings and converted barns is Saint Piran's Chapel, dating from at least the mid fifteenth century, and a holy well, also dedicated to Saint Piran. The well is built over with a mid twentieth century slate beehive and is topped with an iron cross. It is believed by some that the hermitage of Saint Nectan was beside a waterfall, Saint Nectan's Kieve, in Saint Nectan's Glen. Nectan is supposed to have lived above the falls having sailed from Wales on a millstone and was buried nearby.

The waterfall is a popular tourist destination and is viewed by some as a sacred site; at its base are many ribbons, photos, inscriptions, prayers and other offerings.

== Other buildings of historical interest ==
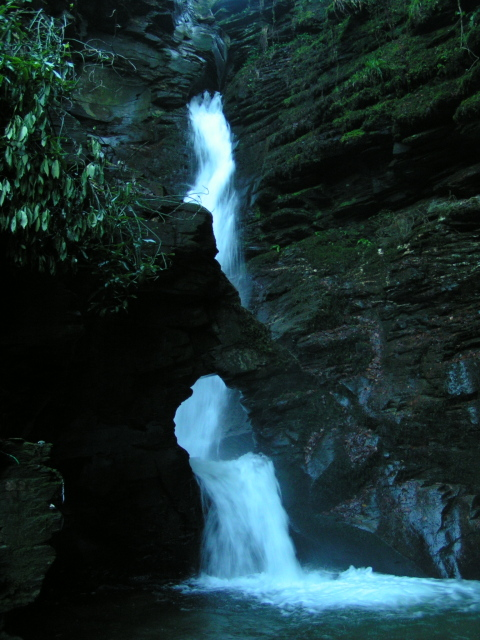
St Nectan's Kieve

Further upstream from Saint Nectan's Glen were the remains of a longhouse, Tregenver, possibly as old as the fourteenth century. The house was inhabited by farm labourers until the late nineteenth century. It is probable that Tregenver (or Genver) can be identified with the manor of Tregrebri as recorded in the Domesday Survey. The house was demolished c. 2015.

Trethevy Manor was built in the twelfth century and was the home of the Wade family who were Trethevy's principal residents until the twentieth century. The Wades were prosperous farmers and many of them served as mayors of the Borough of Bossiney of whom the best known is William Wade (fl. 1756–1786). A contemporary of Mayor Wade was the Rev. Arthur Wade (vicar of Tintagel 1770–1810). The manor is now a private house.

At one time, Trethevy boasted four water mills. Trevalga mill, upstream of Saint Nectan's Kieve, is ruined, Halgabron Mill in the valley below the waterfall is a private residence, Trevillet Mill is also a residence and was made famous by a painting by Thomas Creswick in 1851. Further downstream and the last mill before the ocean is the ruined Trewethet Mill. All appear to have been corn mills but before it closed, Trewethet Mill made 'yarn, blankets and worsted for hose'.

== Literary and artistic associations ==
Charles Dickens and William Thackeray visited Saint Nectan's Glen in 1842 along with Daniel Maclise, who made his preliminary sketches for Nymph at the Waterfall here. St Nectan's Glen is featured in the 1882 novel Mount Royal, by Mary Elizabeth Braddon. Famous people who have lived there include: the writer Clive Arden (1930s); The painter Nicholas St John Rosse; the comics artist John M. Burns; the composer Bill Hopkins; John T. Williams, author of Pooh and the Philosophers.
