= Enticement =

1925 film

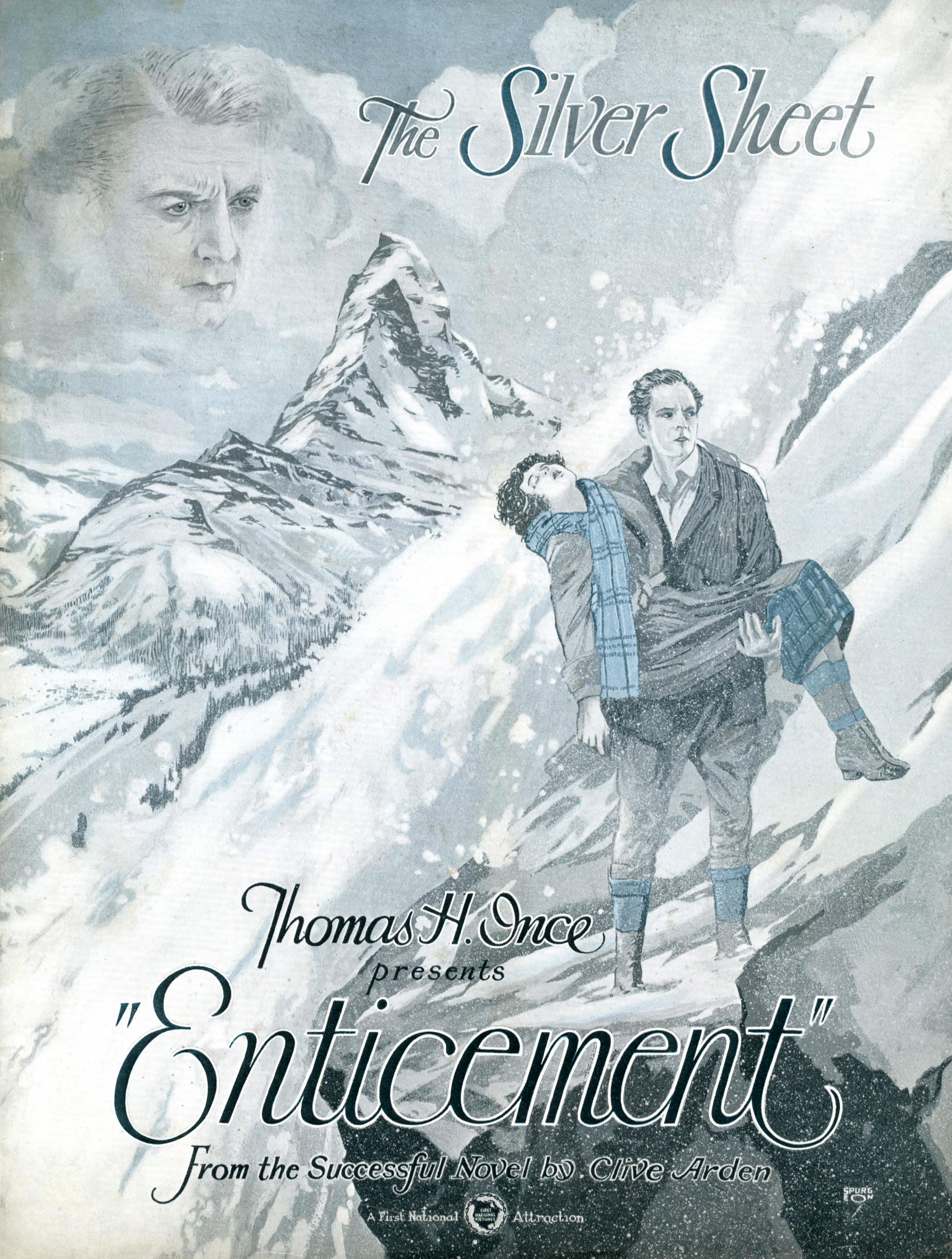
- The Silver Sheet, front cover (1924)
- Directed by: George Archainbaud
- Screenplay by: Bradley King
- Based on: Enticement by Clive Arden
- Produced by: Thomas H. Ince
- Starring: Mary Astor; Clive Brook; Ian Keith
- Cinematography: Henry Sharp
- Production company: Thomas H. Ince Corporation
- Distributed by: First National Pictures
- Release date: February 1, 1925
- Running time: 70 minutes
- Country: United States
- Language: Silent (English intertitles)

Enticement is a 1925 American silent drama film directed by George Archainbaud and starring Mary Astor, Clive Brook, and Ian Keith.

== Plot ==
As described in a review in a film magazine, Leonore Bewlay (Astor), recently grown into womanhood, while in Switzerland meets a childhood friend, Richard Valyran (Keith), who has become an opera singer. When she is injured, she is shocked into a bewilderment of panic and flees when, as he undresses her to assist, he also kisses her. She marries Henry Wallis (Brook), a devout Englishman, but is disliked by his relatives. Val's wife names Leonore as a correspondent in her divorce suit and Henry loses faith in her. She goes to Val, who still loves her, but he refuses her when he learns that she still loves Henry. In order to free her from any notoriety, Val kills himself. Henry, awed by this sacrifice, takes Leonore back and they find happiness together.

== Cast ==
- Mary Astor as Leonore Bewlay
- Clive Brook as Henry Wallis
- Ian Keith as Richard Valyran
- Louise Dresser as Mrs. Samuel Murray
- Edgar Norton as William Blake
- Vera Lewis as Mrs. Blake
- Lillian Langdon as Mrs. Edward Merley
- Lorimer Johnston as Edward Merley
- Maxine Elliott Hicks as Olive Merley
- Fenwick Oliver as Mr. Kerry
- Florence Wix as Mrs. Kerry
- George Bunny as The bishop
- Roland Bottomley as Bevington
- Aileen Manning as The old maid

== Preservation ==
With no prints of Enticement located in any film archives, it is a lost film.

== Bibliography ==
- Goble, Alan. The Complete Index to Literary Sources in Film. Walter de Gruyter, 1999.
