= Sinners in Heaven =

1924 film by Alan Crosland

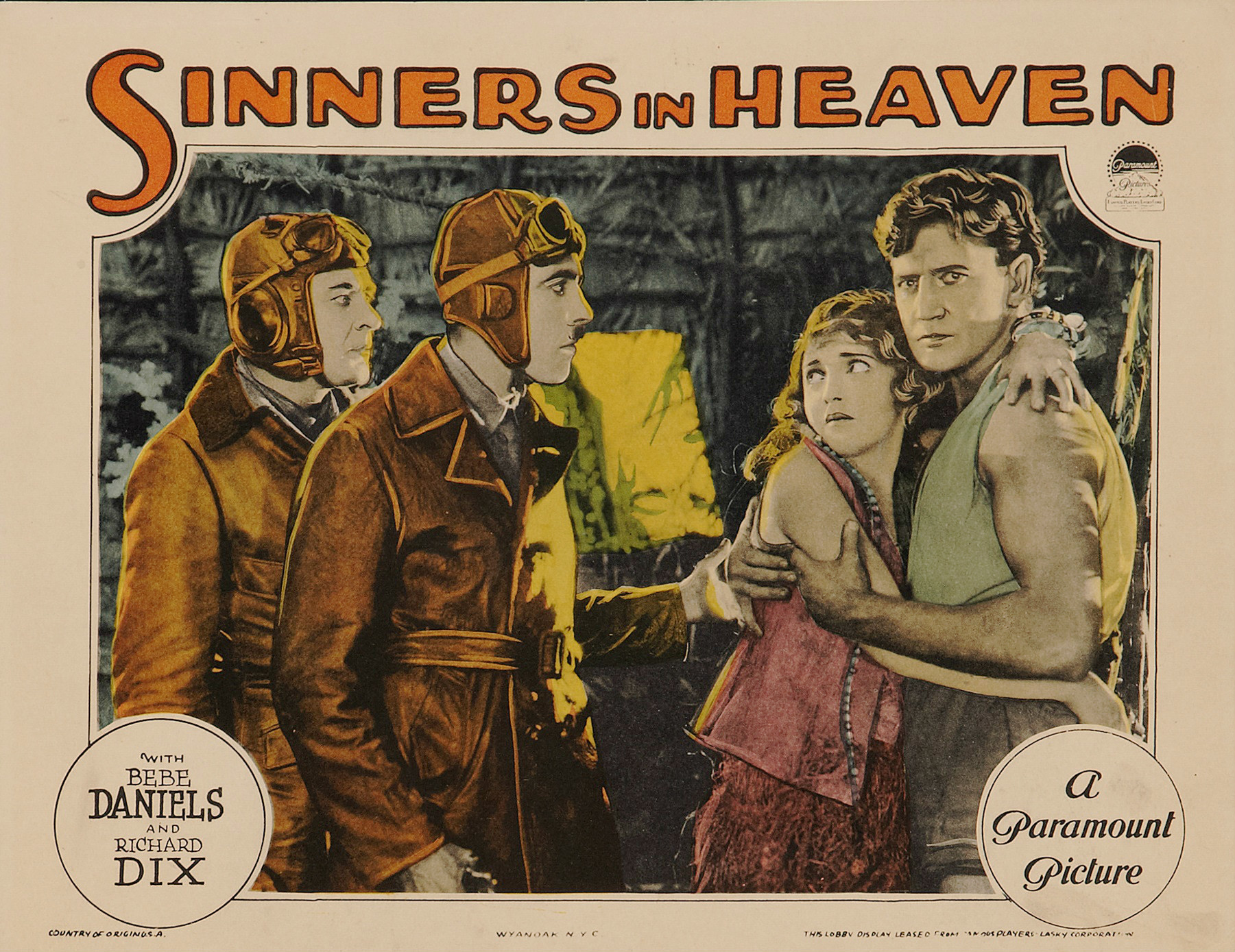
- Lobby card
- Directed by: Alan Crosland
- Screenplay by: James Ashmore Creelman
- Based on: Sinners in Heaven by Clive Arden
- Produced by: Adolph Zukor; Jesse L. Lasky
- Starring: Bebe Daniels; Richard Dix
- Cinematography: Henry Cronjager
- Production company: Famous Players–Lasky
- Distributed by: Paramount Pictures
- Release date: September 15, 1924
- Running time: 70 minutes at 7 reels (6,881 ft)
- Country: United States
- Language: Silent (English intertitles)

Sinners in Heaven is a 1924 American silent island romantic drama film directed by Alan Crosland and released through Paramount Pictures. It is based on the novel of the same name by Clive Arden and stars Richard Dix and Bebe Daniels in the principal roles.

== Plot ==
According to a film magazine, "A young woman who, with a chaperon, accompanies an English aviator on what is hoped will be a world's trip, laying out an aerial mall route for the British Government. When the plane is wrecked the girl and the aviator are the sole survivors. They fight off the savages, and finally convince them that they are Gods, although in the finish a native woman whom the aviator scorns, explodes the God idea, and just as the rescuers arrive in another plane the two are attacked. They also fight off the natives, but when the two rescuers take the girl and make a getaway the aviator was wounded by an arrow and left to his fate.

Later he turns up in England, having been nursed back to health by the native woman and making his escape when a trading boat stops at the island. Of course his arrival is just in time to bring about a happy ending, for the girl on her return has confessed that she and the aviator were wed by their own ceremony while on the island, but the folks back home can't grant this was on the level and she is shunned."

== Cast ==
- Bebe Daniels as Barbara Stockley
- Richard Dix as Alan Croft
- Holmes Herbert as Hugh Rochedale
- Florence Billings as Mrs. Madge Fields
- Betty Hilburn as Native Girl
- Montagu Love as Native Chief
- Effie Shannon as Mrs. Stockley
- Marcia Harris as Barbara's Aunt
- Diana Kane

== Production ==
Sinners in Heaven was partially filmed on location in Nassau, Bahamas.

== Preservation ==
With no prints of Sinners in Heaven located in any film archives, it is a lost film.

== See also ==
- List of lost films
- South Seas genre
