= St Nectan's Glen =

Valley in Tintagel, United Kingdom

Coordinates: 50.6648°N 4.7192°W

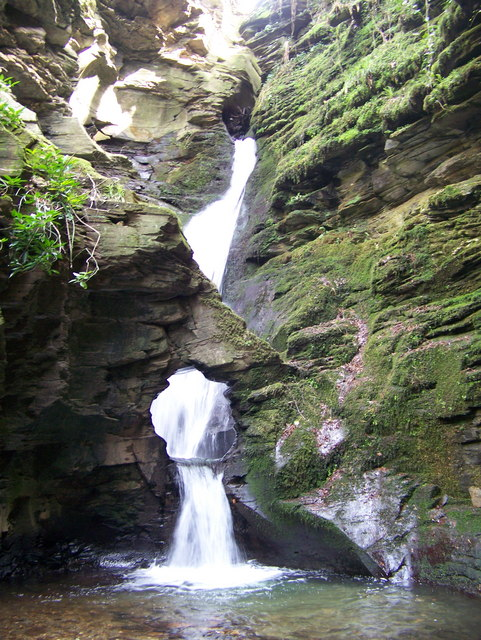
Waterfall at St Nectan's Kieve

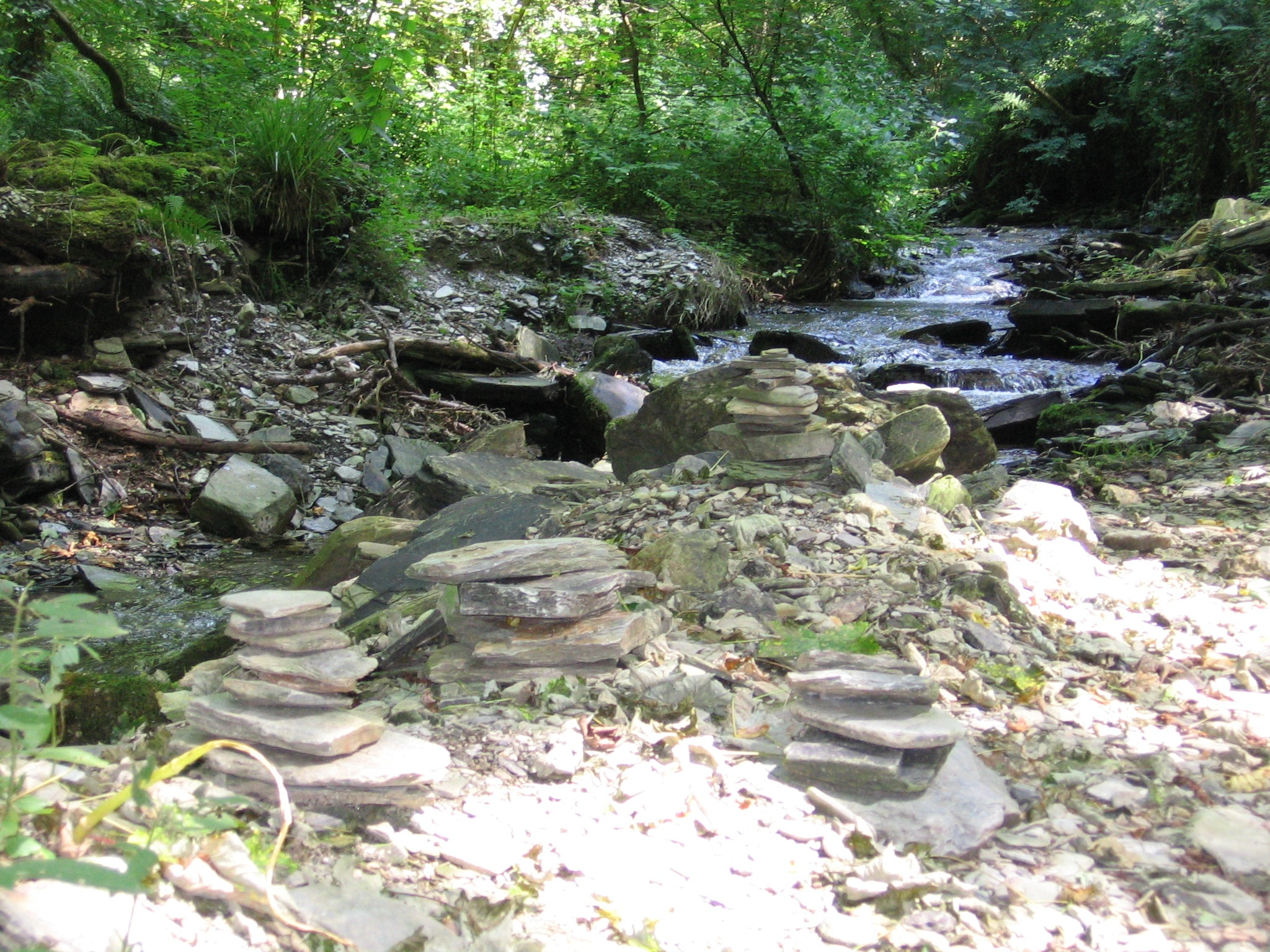
The Trevillet River in Saint Nectan's Glen

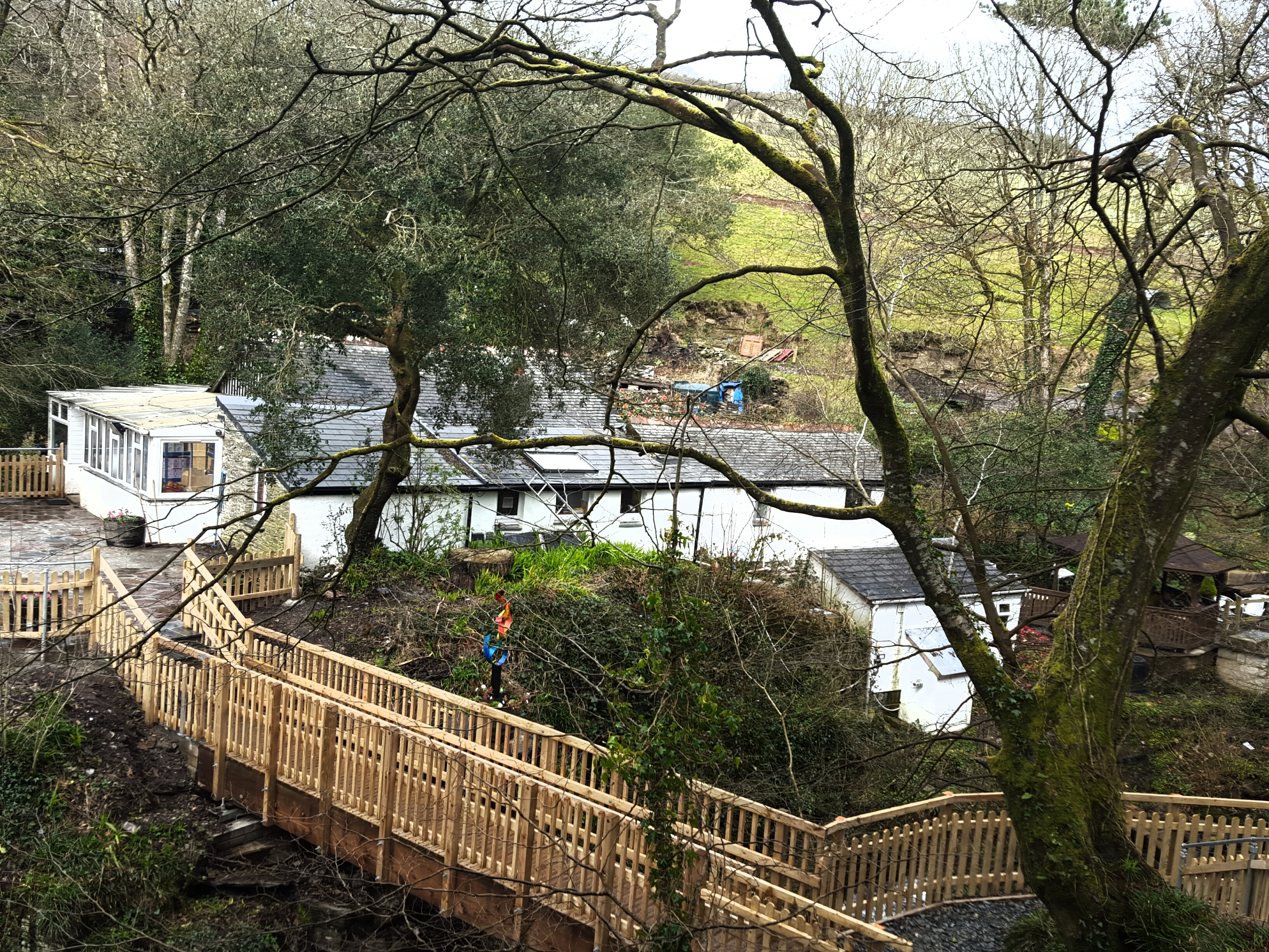
The Hermitage

Saint Nectan's Glen (Cornish: Glynn Nathan, meaning deep wooded valley of Nathan/Nectan) is an area of woodland in Trethevy near Tintagel, north Cornwall stretching for around one mile along both banks of the Trevillet River. The glen's most prominent feature is St Nectan's Kieve, a spectacular sixty foot waterfall through a hole in the rocks. The site attracts tourists who believe it to be "one of the UK's most spiritual sites," and tie or place ribbons, crystals, photographs, small piles of flat stones and other materials near the waterfall.

In 2025, a horned skull resembling that of a so-called “unicorn” was discovered by a family visiting St Nectan’s Glen. The find received widespread media coverage and prompted a flurry of speculation. While scientists have not identified the specimen as anything beyond natural remains, local legend quickly embraced it as “Merlin’s unicorn” — a mythical creature said to have been ridden by the wizard during the legendary Battle of Badon. The skull’s discovery renewed public interest in the Glen’s mystical associations and contributed to contemporary Arthurian folklore.

== History and buildings ==
It is believed locally that, in the sixth century, Saint Nectan had a hermitage above the waterfall and rang a silver bell to warn ships of the dangers of offshore rocks at the mouth of the Rocky Valley during storms. However, this is myth concocted by Victorian romanticists such as R. S. Hawker and the valley has no religious connections save the remains of a monastery and a small chapel in nearby Trethevy dedicated to St Piran. The site was known as Nathan's Cave in 1799, named after a local character, either Nathan Williams or Nathan Cock. There is a late nineteenth or early twentieth century half-timbered private residence known as The Hermitage, constructed on the remains of an eighteenth century summer house or folly. Further downstream are the brick remains of St Gerwyn, a house which was destroyed in a fire in the mid-twentieth century. The supposed connection with St Nectan is a Victorian invention and the current use of the site as a place for depositing "sacred offerings" is a more recent invention. The even more recent fashion for calling the waterfall Merlin's Well has no basis in any local tradition. June 17 is the feast day of St Nectan.

== Flora and fauna ==
As a result of the glen's flora and fauna it was designated a Site of Special Scientific Interest in 1985. The damp shade provided by the glen supports a rich bryophyte flora, including two rare liverworts Jubula hutchinsiae and Trichocolea tomentella, and the mosses Fissidens curnovii and Fissidens osmundoides. Dippers (Cinclus cinclus) also nest in the rocks near Saint Nectan's Kieve.

== Ownership and access ==
The site is privately owned but there is free public access to the glen. A charge is made to visit the waterfall.

In 2011 the Friends of St Nectan's Glen attempted to raise enough money to buy the site of 14 acres from the owner Barry Litton. A guide price of £800,000 was set by the estate agents. The site and adjacent café were purchased in 2012 by Guy Mills, a business park owner who said that his intention was to maintain it as "a place of inward reflection and self-realisation for everyone to enjoy". The café reportedly attracted 10,000 visitors a year, before its recent refurbishment under the new owners.

== See also ==
- Clootie well
- List of waterfalls
- List of waterfalls in England
