= St Nectan's Kieve =

Waterfall and pool in Cornwall

Coordinates: 50°39′51″N 4°42′36″W

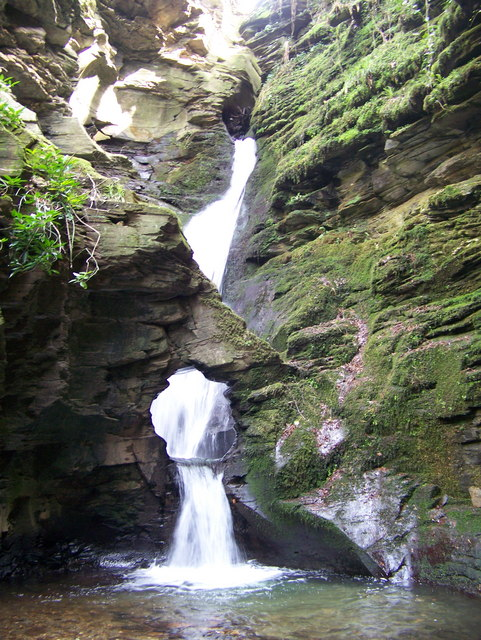
Waterfall in St Nectan's Glen, Trethevy, Cornwall

Video of St Nectan's Kieve

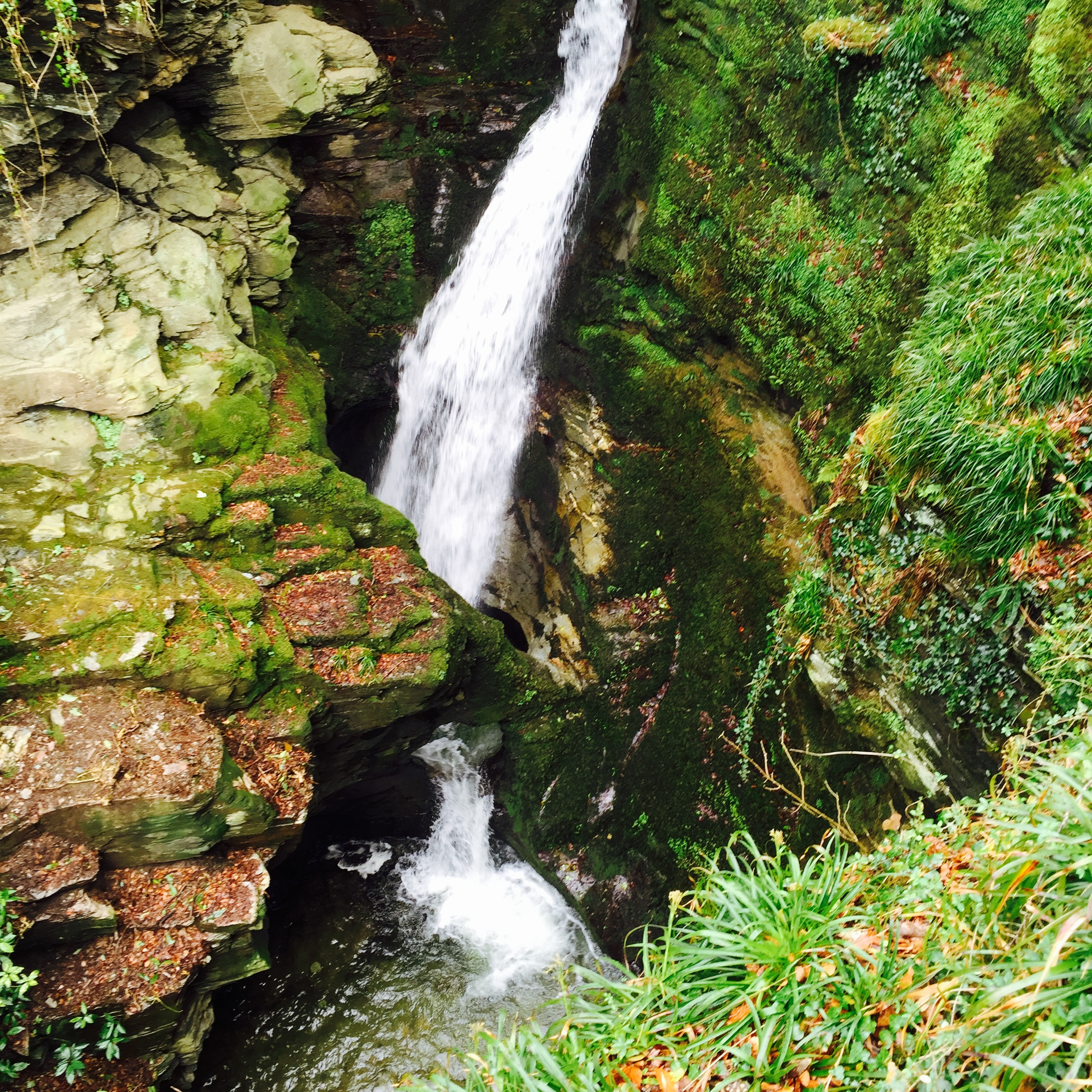
View from the Woodland Walk

Saint Nectan's Kieve (Cornish: Cuva Nathan, meaning Nathan's tub) in Saint Nectan's Glen, near Tintagel in Cornwall, Great Britain, is a plunge pool or basin fed by a 60-foot-high (18 m) waterfall on the Trevillet River.

== Geology ==
The river is carved into Late Devonian slate and several earlier kieves can be seen further up the rock walls of the waterfall. The current basin is estimated to be around 12 feet (3.7 m) deep, and the water emerges through a natural rock arch to drop a further 10 feet (3.0 m) to a wide shallow pool.

== Origins of the name ==
The idea that the sixth-century Saint Nectan had his hermitage above the waterfall is myth. According to legend, Nectan rang a silver bell in times of stormy weather to warn shipping of the perils of the rocks at the mouth of the Rocky Valley. Though other legends are also told of Nectan (such as his burial under the riverbed), no evidence exists to substantiate Nectan's presence here. His home was further north, in what is now Hartland, Devon. The name is first recorded in 1799 as Nathan's Cave in reference to a local character, either Nathan Williams or Nathan Cock, and the Cornish word Cuva (pronounced keeva) meaning tub.

== Legend ==
The legend connecting St Nectan to the falls is the romantic whimsy of the nineteenth century clergyman, Reverend Robert Stephen Hawker who first attributed the falls to the saint in his poem, The Sisters of the Glen in 1846. The "hermitage" written about by Hawker and others was a simple summerhouse and had no connection to any saint. Many of the site's legends are the result of Hawker's poetry and the vivid imagination of nineteenth century Trethevy farmer, William Goard who led tour parties to the falls.

== Recognition as a sacred site ==
Saint Nectan's Kieve is believed by some to be a sacred place or cloutie well, and numerous ribbons, crystals, photographs, inscriptions, prayers and other devotions now adorn the foliage and rock walls near the waterfall. Many visitors add small piles of flat stones obtained from the stream.

== In literature ==
Letitia Elizabeth Landon's poetical illustration St. Knighton’s Kieve, on an engraving of a painting by Thomas Allom, is based on a legend she was told concerning hidden treasure submerged at the foot of the falls. In the poem she writes of a charmed golden cup, which, with some poetic licence, is found to be irretrievable. Wilkie Collins visits the Glen, which he terms Nighton's Kieve, in Rambles Beyond Railways. He and his companion find the Kieve impossible to locate, shrouded in impenetrable undergrowth.

== The Hermitage ==
A building reputed to be the site of Saint Nectan's cell is situated at the top of the waterfall; the date of the building is uncertain. It is most probably an 18th-century summerhouse, and the legends are due to the imaginations of R. S. Hawker and William Goard, yeoman of Trethevy. The current owners claim that the ruins of the chapel provide the lower part of the walls of a cottage erected in the 1860s, and extended around 1900. Tea gardens are open in the Hermitage grounds between April and October and a new woodland walkway (opened March 2016) allows visitors to view the falls from above. These views were previously only available by climbing the rocks above the falls.

== See also ==
- List of waterfalls
- List of waterfalls in England
