= Clive Arden =

English author (1888–1973)

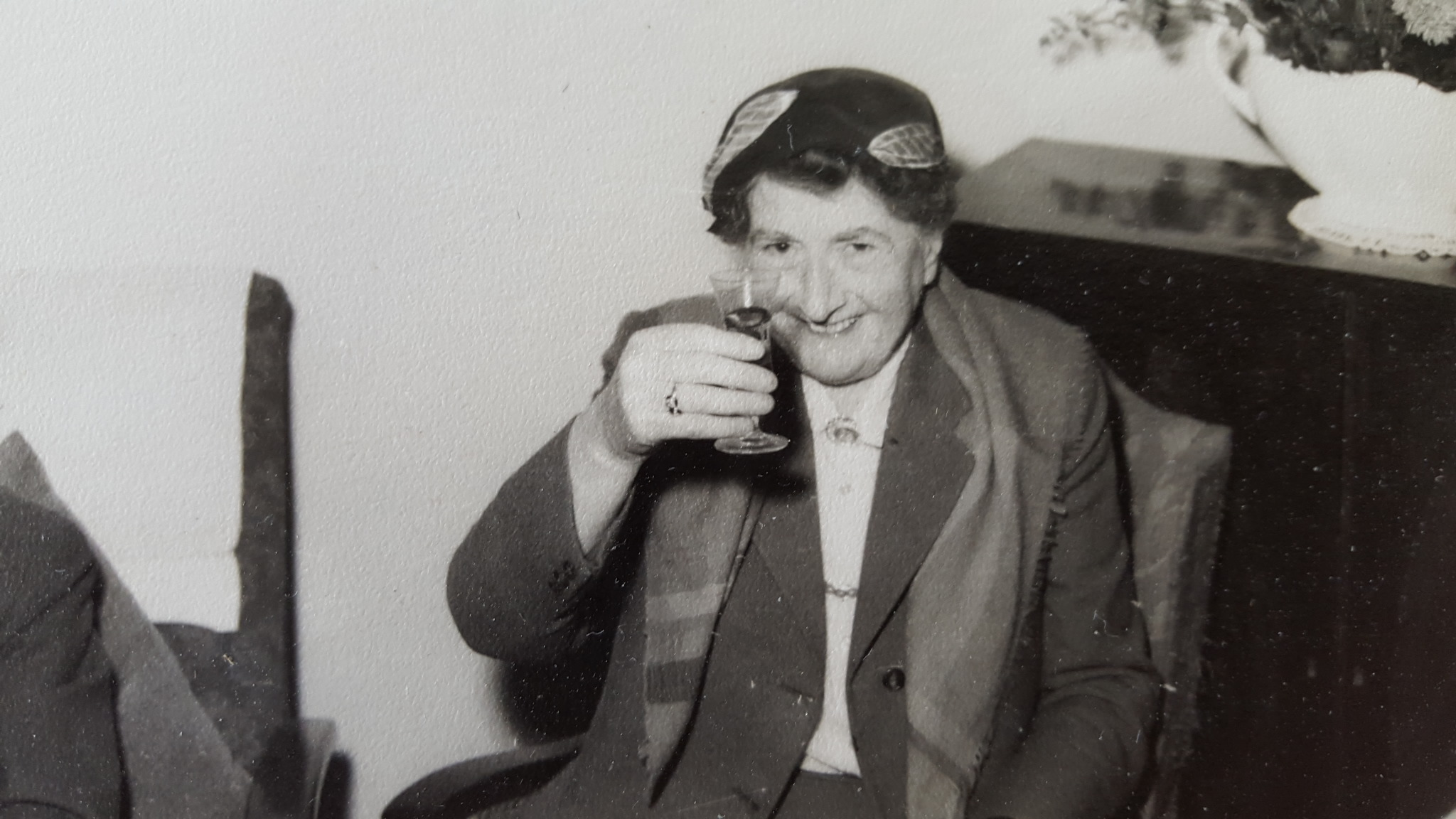
- Lily Nutt in Trethevy, Cornwall
- Born: 8 February 1888
- Died: 1973 (aged 84–85)
- Occupation: Novelist
- Genre: Romance

The Silver Sheet, a studio publication promoting Thomas Ince Productions cover illustration of Enticement written by Clive Arden

Clive Arden (8 February 1888 – 1973) was the pen name of the English author, Lily Clive Nutt (1888 - after 1950). Arden lived in Trethevy, near Tintagel, Cornwall.

== Bibliography ==
Arden wrote romantic fiction and her works include:

- Sinners in Heaven (1923)
- Enticement (1924)
- Four Complete Novels (1931)
- The Fetters Of Eve (1934)
- The Enchanted Spring (1935)
- The Veil of Glamour (1935)
- The Spider and the Fly (1935)
- The Eagle's Wing (1938)
- Anthony Keeps Tryst (1940)

== Adaptations and legacy ==
Both Sinners in Heaven and Enticement were turned into silent movies by Paramount. Sinners in Heaven was directed by Alan Crosland in 1924 and starred Bebe Daniels and Richard Dix. Enticement was directed by George Archainbaud in 1925 and starred Mary Astor and Clive Brook.

Arden died in Stratton, Cornwall in 1973.
