= Rocky Valley =

Valley in north Cornwall, England

Coordinates: 50.6736°N 4.7295°W

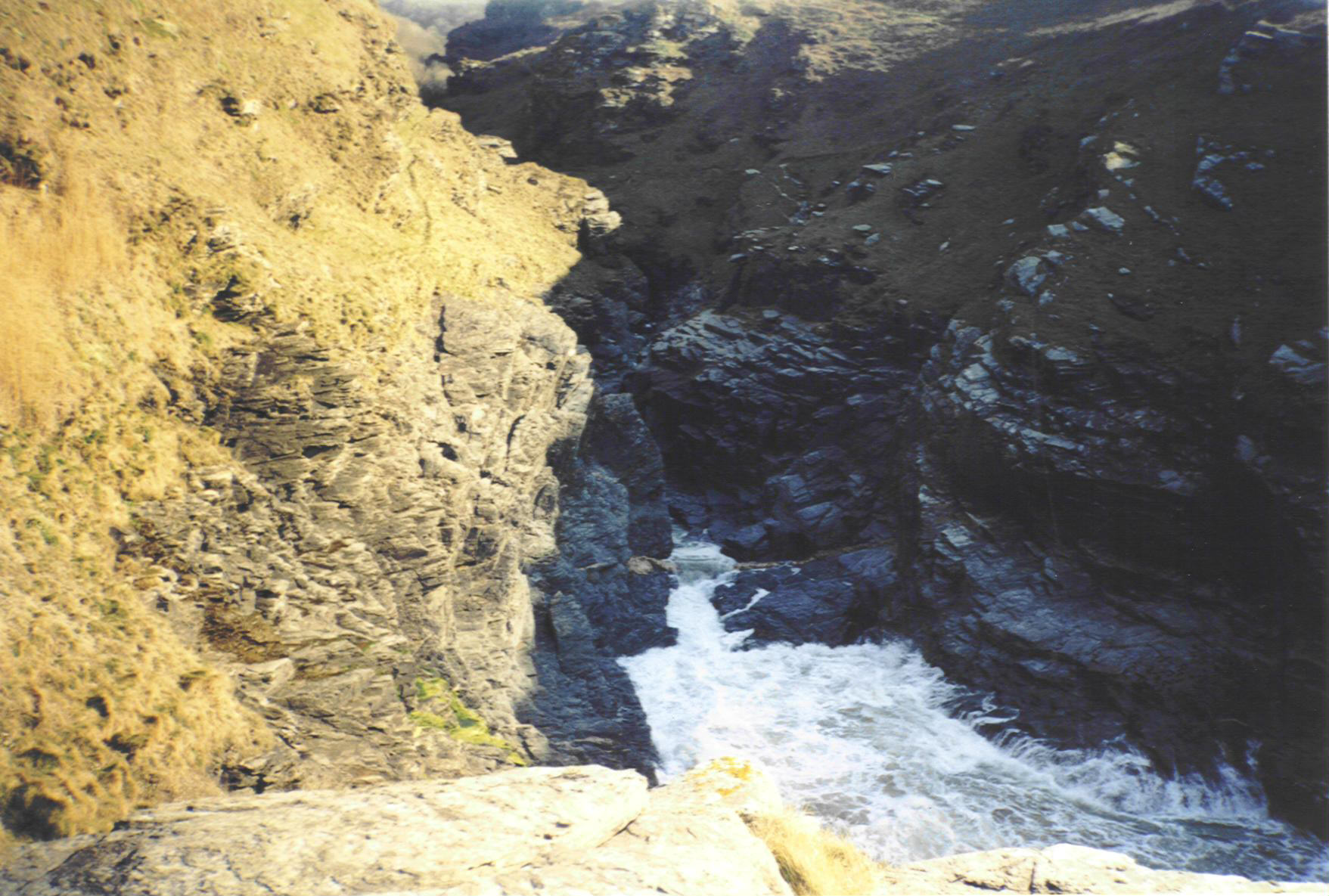
Rocky Valley at low tide, looking upstream (south)

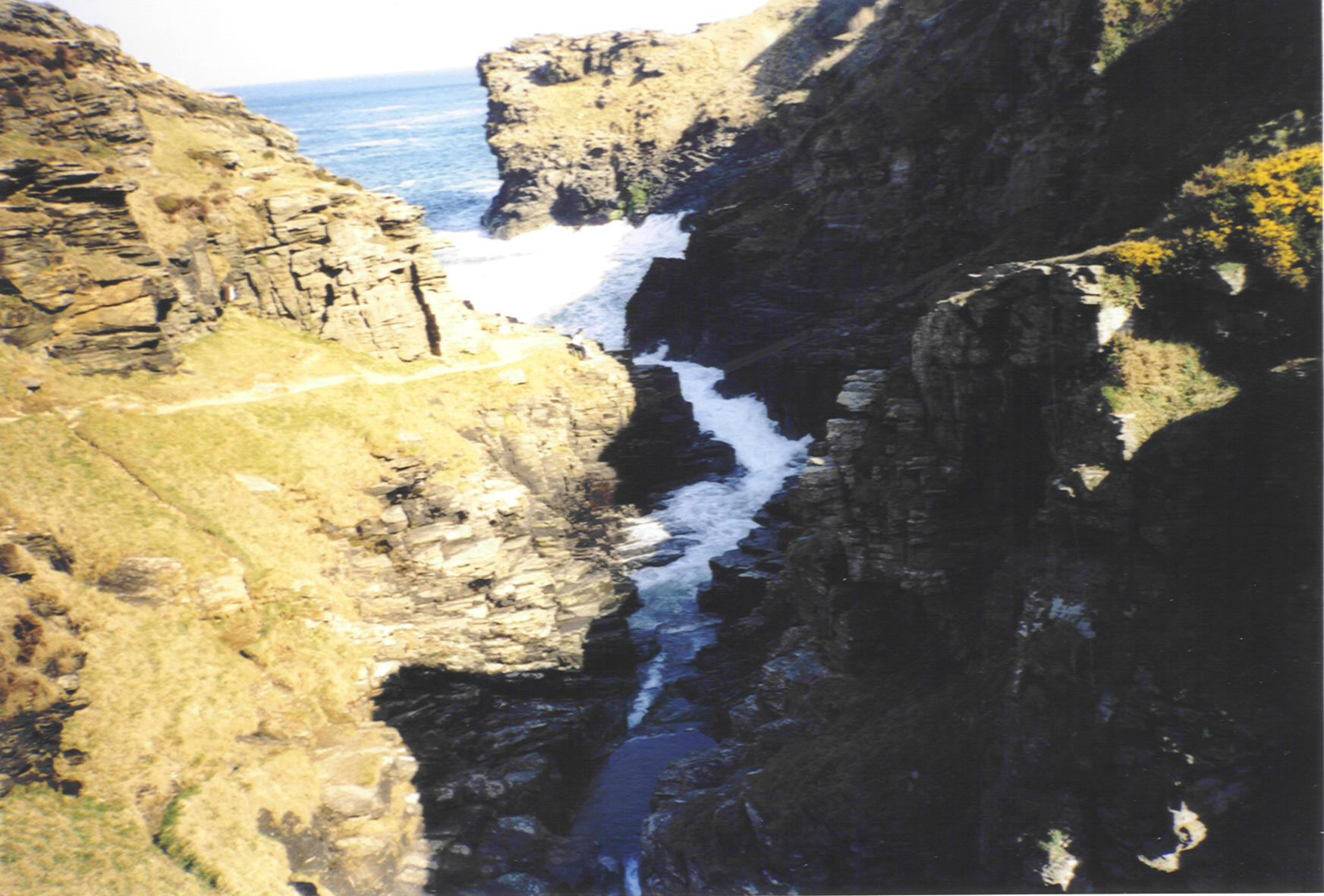
Rocky Valley looking out to sea (North)

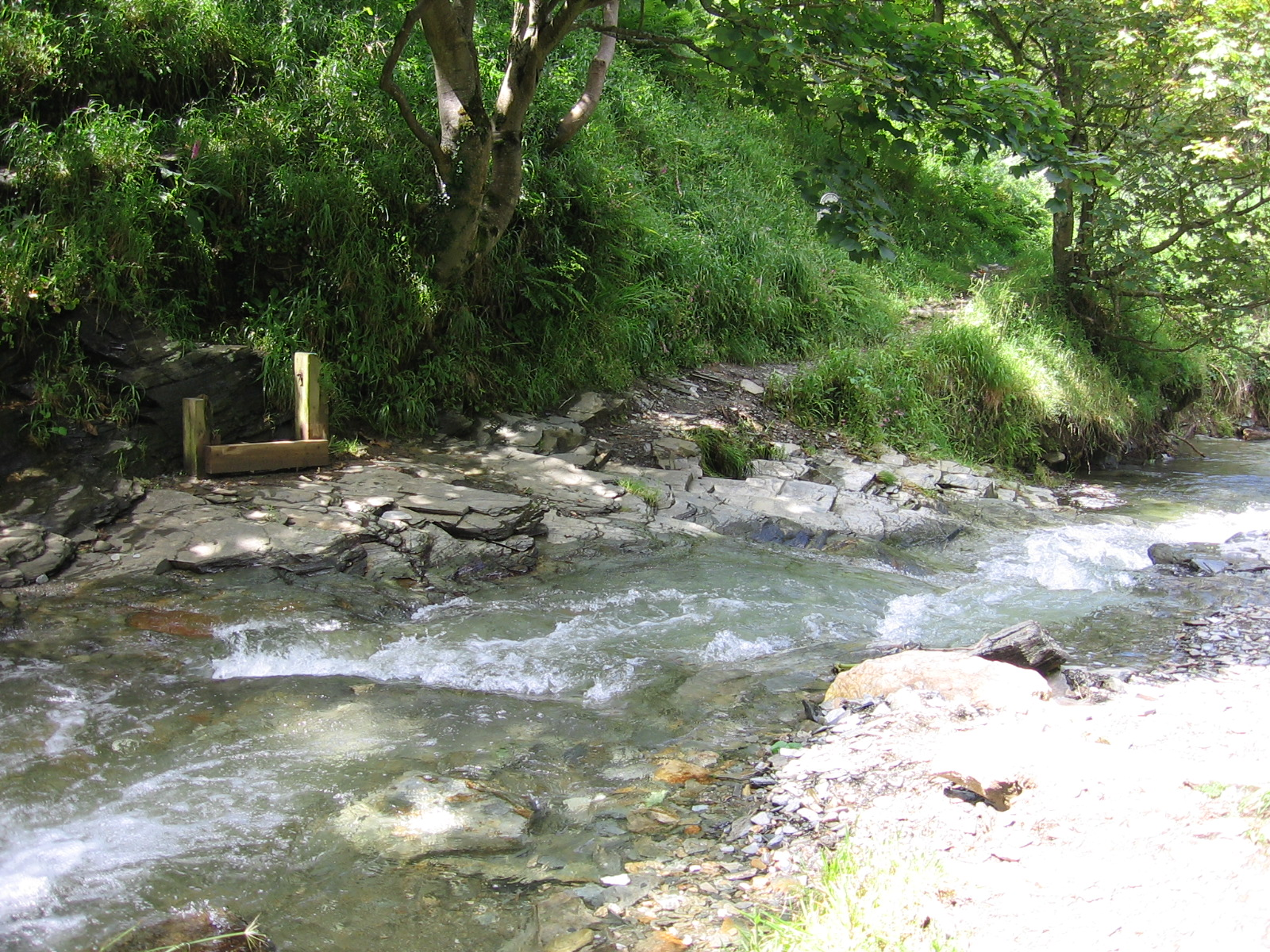
Damaged bridge in Rocky Valley

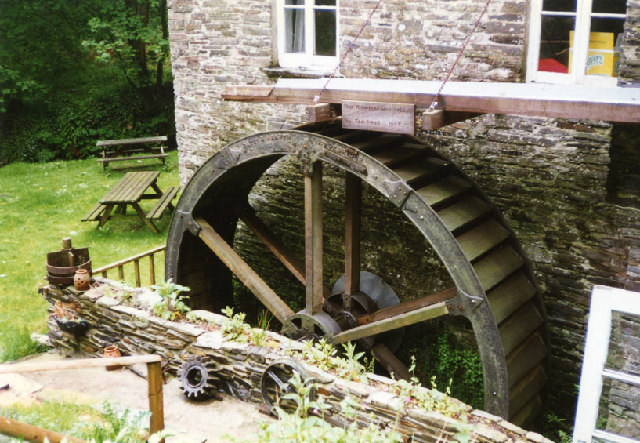
Wheel at Trevillet Mill

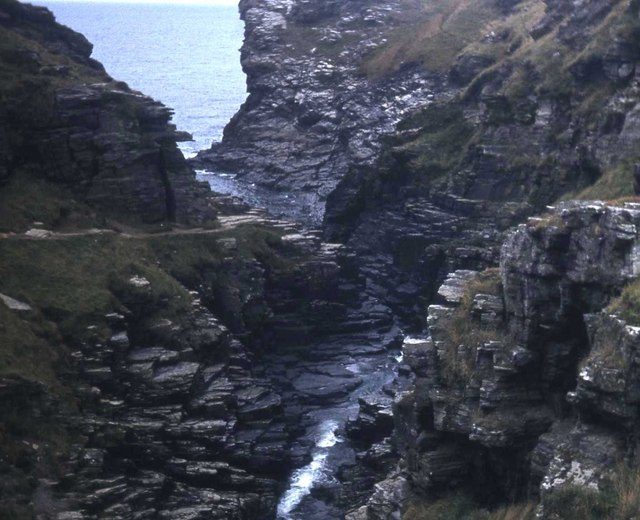
The mouth of the river

Rocky Valley (Cornish: Glynn Duwy, meaning deep valley of the river Duwy) is a small valley in the parish of Tintagel, north Cornwall, England, United Kingdom.

The valley has been carved by the Trevillet River (Cornish: Duwy, meaning dark river) in Trethevy around one mile east of Tintagel. At their highest point the slate canyon walls tower over seventy feet above the river below. Rocky Valley was mentioned in travel books as a place of exceptional beauty as early as 1897. The valley is owned by the National Trust and is home to 161 different species of moss. Saint Nectan's Glen is an area of woodland stretching for around one mile along both banks of the Trevillet River; its most prominent feature is St Nectan's Kieve.

Rocky Valley is designated as a County Geology Site because of its geomorphological interest.

The valley is within the Cornwall National Landscape, which is formally designated as the Cornwall Area of Outstanding Natural Beauty.

The South West Coast Path descends into and out of the valley a little way inland due to the sheer cliffs on the coast; the rocks at the seaward end of the valley are dangerous and people have been swept off by freak waves.

In 2007 some of the bridges over the Trevillet River were washed away during flash floods caused by heavy rains. These have since been replaced.

== Buildings ==
=== Mills ===
There are three mills on the Trevillet River: Trethevy or Trewethett Mill, Trevillet Mill and Halgabron Mill. Trevillet Mill is now a private residence and was made famous by an 1851 painting by Thomas Creswick. The lowest, Trethevy Mill, is derelict and was used in the eighteenth century to manufacture woollen textiles.

There are a number of dates carved into the stonework of the derelict Trethevy Mill.

- W. T. 1779 - William Taylor; the earliest date identified so far
- D. R. 1794 - D. Rogers
- T. B. 1797 - Thomas Brown
- G. B. 1813 - G. Blewett; this date marks the extension of the mill

=== Maze carvings ===
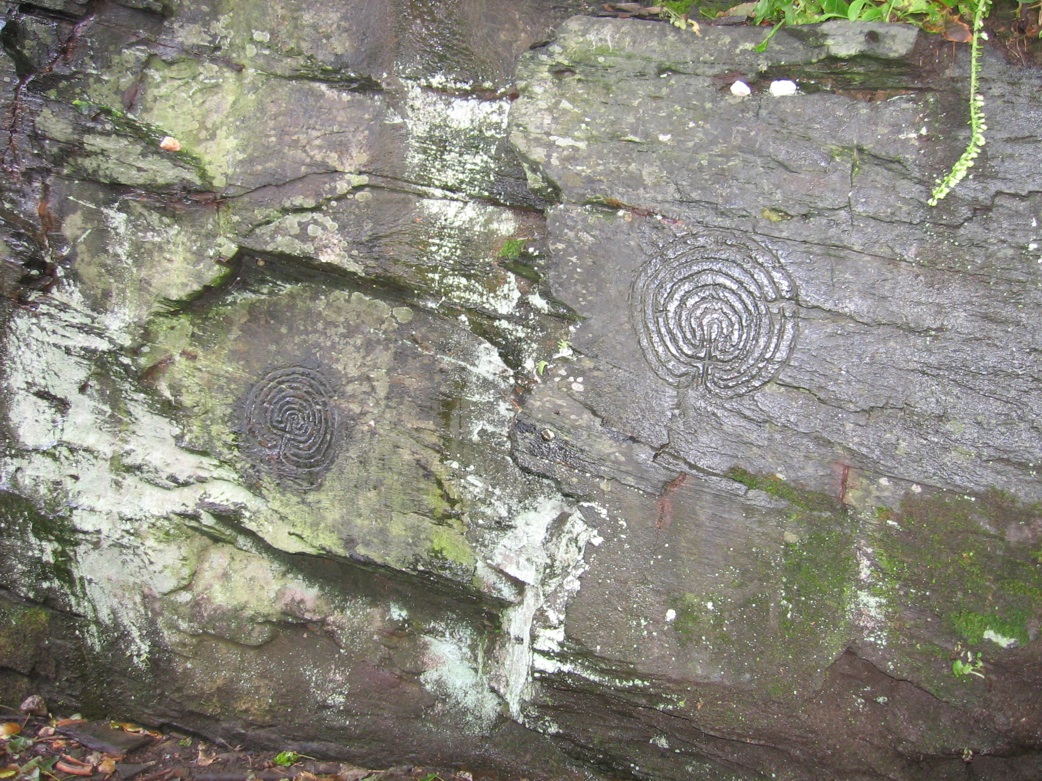
Rocky Valley carvings

Rock carvings discovered in 1948 are believed by some to be from the early Bronze Age (1800-1400 BC). The two carvings take the form of circular labyrinths. Modern scholars believe that, as the labyrinths were carved on a quarried wall with a metal tool, they are likely to be less than three hundred years old. In 2005 it was claimed that another carving can be seen, much fainter than the first two, leading to speculation that the two well-defined carvings are copies of ones that are much earlier: this has yet to be proved.

The area around these carvings has become somewhat of a focus for Neopaganism and New Age beliefs.

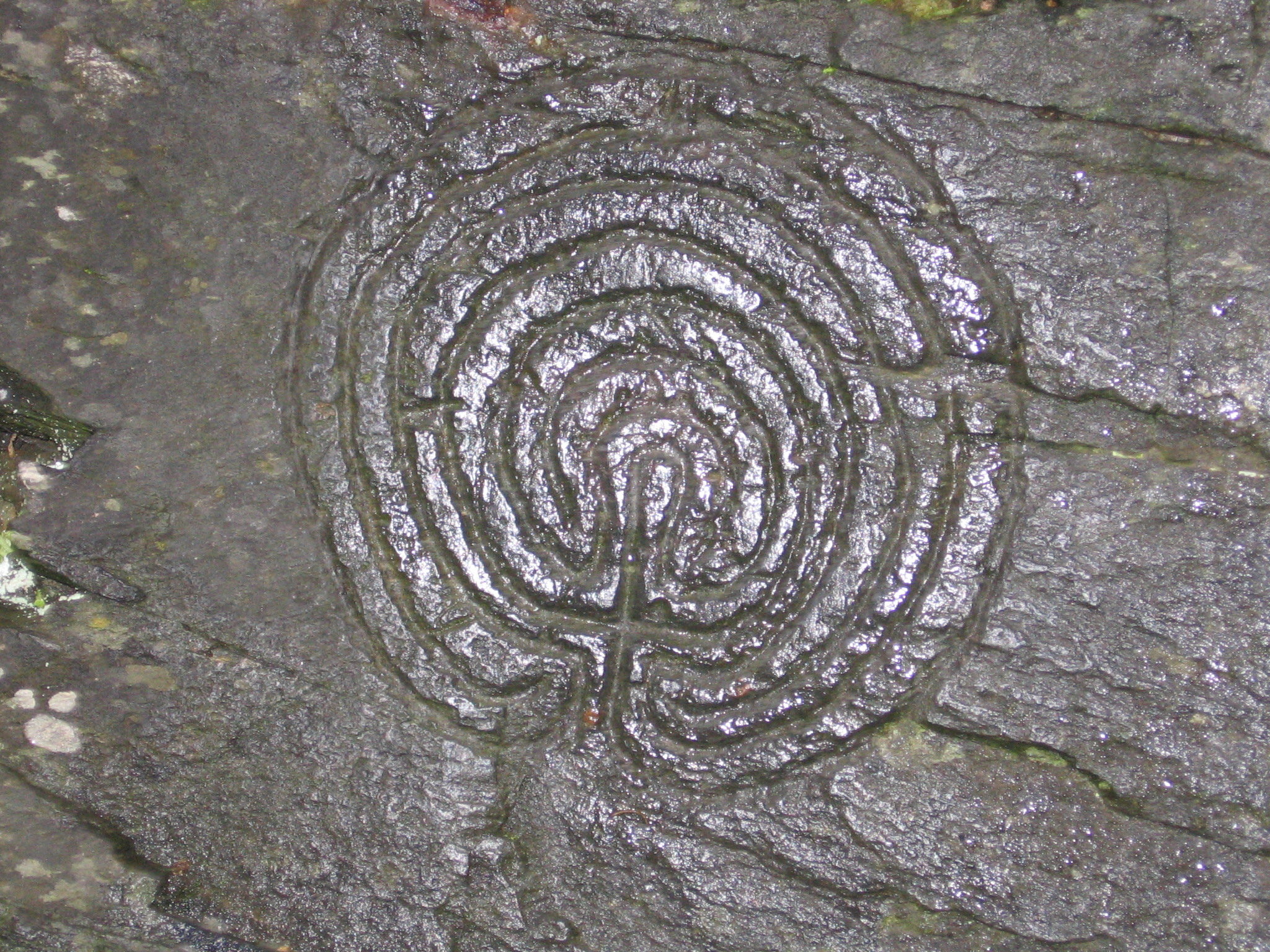
Close-up of Rocky Valley carving

== References and bibliography ==
- Madge, Sidney J. (1950) The "Chapel", Kieve and Gorge of "Saint Nectan", Trevillet Millcombe, Tintagel. (82 pp.; illus.) Bodmin: Liddell and Son
- Canner, A. C. (1982) The Parish of Tintagel. Camelford: A. C. Canner; sections 2 & 87; appendix I
