= Lesnewth Hundred =

Ancient administrative unit of Cornwall, England

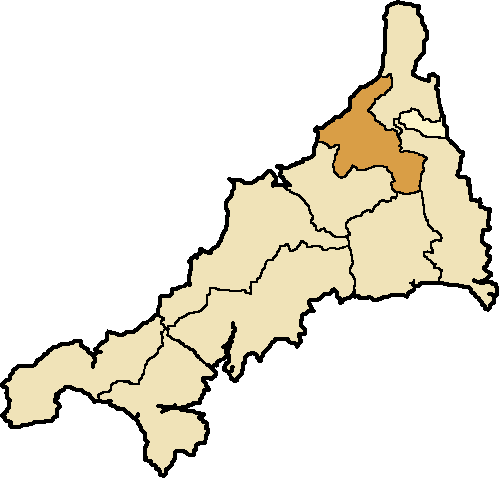
Lesnewth shown within Cornwall

Lesnewth Hundred is one of the former hundreds of Cornwall, England, United Kingdom. Trigg was to the south-west and Stratton Hundred to the north-east. Tintagel, Camelford, Boscastle, and Altarnun were in the Hundred of Lesnewth as well as Lesnewth which is now a hamlet but in pre-Norman times was the seat of a Celtic chieftain who was said to rule the whole of Trigg.

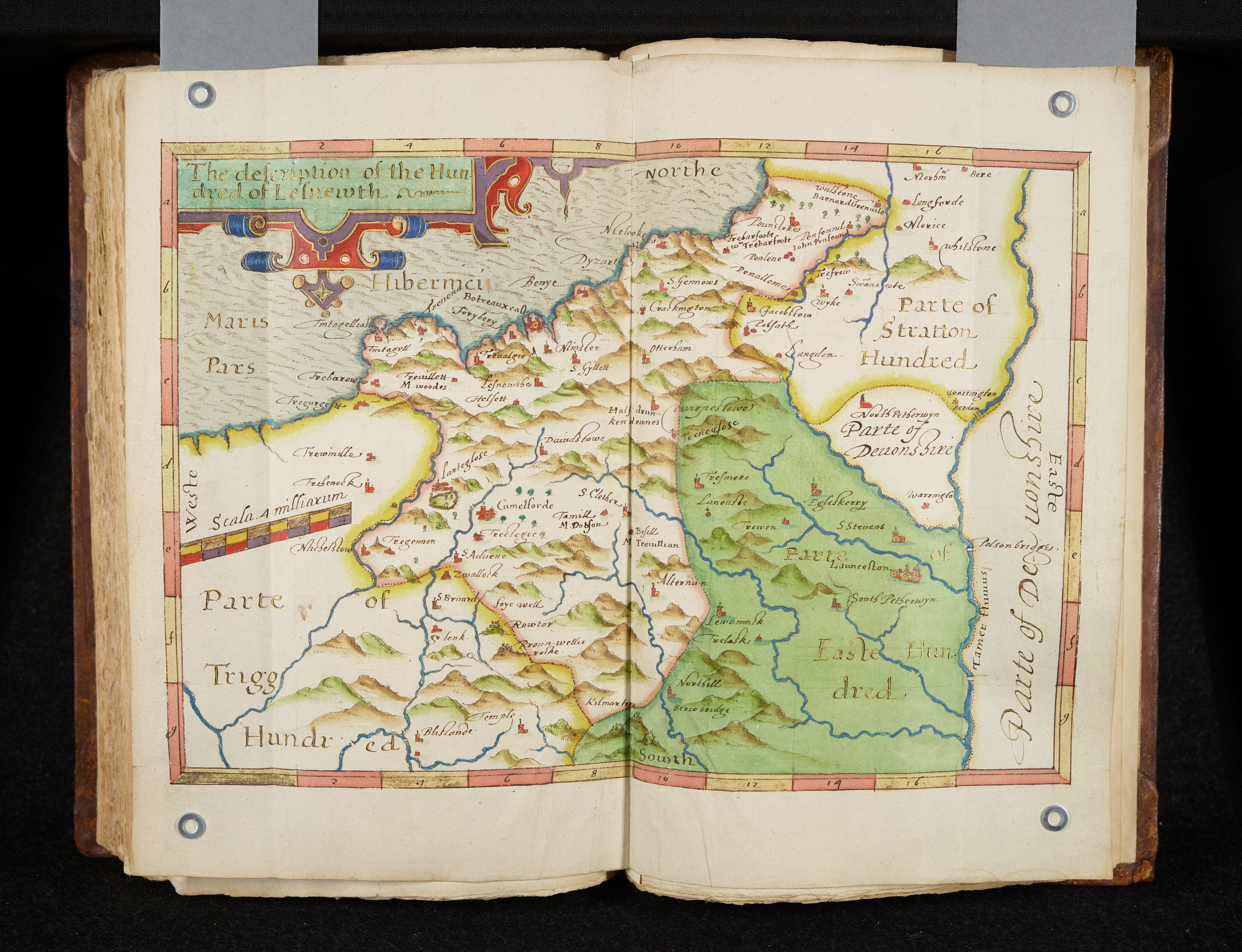
Norden's map of Lesnewth Hundred.

The division into hundreds is thought to date from the reign of King Athelstan and at the time of the Domesday Survey the internal order of manors in the Exeter Domesday Book for Cornwall is in most cases based on the hundreds to which they belonged (though the hundred names are not used). In the Geld Inquest of 1083 only seven hundreds are found, identified by the names of the chief manors: Connerton, Winnianton, Pawton, Tybesta, Stratton, Fawton and Rillaton. Here Stratton represents a single hundred including the later Stratton, Lesnewth and Trigg.

== Parishes ==
Advent, Altarnun, St Clether, Davidstow, Forrabury, St Gennys, St Juliot, Lanteglos-by-Camelford, Lesnewth, Michaelstow, Minster, Otterham, Poundstock, Tintagel (with Bossiney), Treneglos, Trevalga, Warbstow.
