= A Seaside Parish =

British television documentary

A Seaside Parish is a British television documentary made by Tiger Aspect Productions for BBC Two which was first broadcast in 2003. Following the success of A Country Parish, the programme concerns the life of a new incumbent (known as the Rector) and general parish life in the village of Boscastle and the adjoining district, a picturesque but isolated community in North Cornwall.

The Rev Christine Musser and her American husband arrived in Boscastle at the start of that year when she was appointed Priest-in-Charge of Boscastle with Davidstow. The programme was also filmed during the Boscastle flood of 2004.

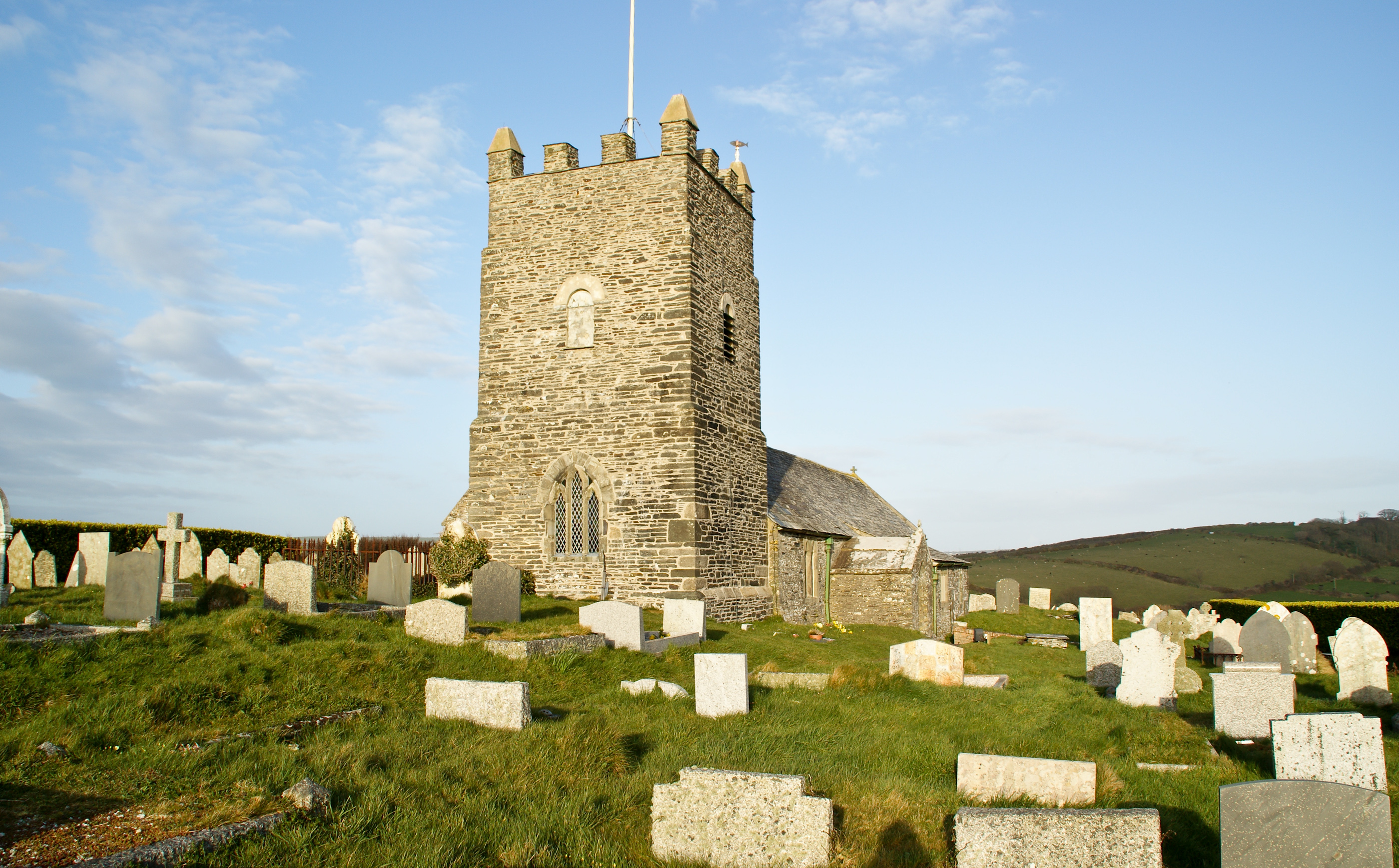
Forrabury Parish Church

The Boscastle Group has within it six parishes and seven churches, six of which are Grade II listed buildings. The total area covered by the parishes is more than 20,000 acres (81 km^{2}), although within that large area the total population is only 1,850 people. The Rector of Boscastle is responsible for seven churches in the village and surrounding district: Forrabury (St Symphorian), Minster (St Merthiana), St. Juliot, Lesnewth (St Michael and All Angels), Trevalga (St Petroc), Otterham (St Denis) and Davidstow (St David).

The programme was followed by the series An Island Parish in 2007, which focused on the clergy and parishioners of the Isles of Scilly.
