= Boscastle =

Village and port in Cornwall, England

Coordinates: 50.6840°N 4.6929°W

Boscastle: Cornish: Kastelboterel
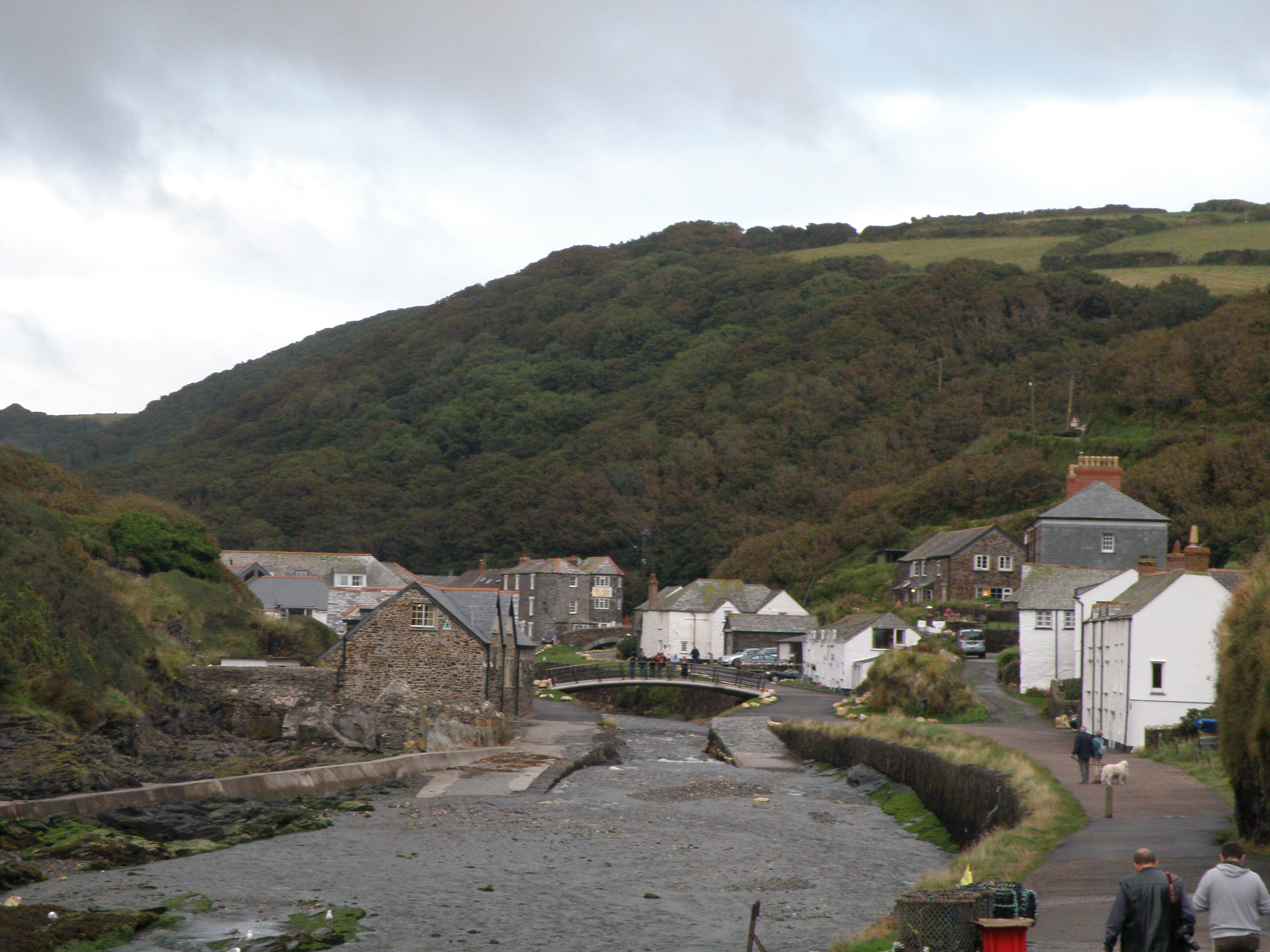

- Location within Cornwall
- OS grid reference: SX098906
- Civil parish: Forrabury and Minster
- Shire county: Cornwall
- Region: South West
- Country: England
- Sovereign state: United Kingdom
- Post town: BOSCASTLE
- Postcode district: PL35
- Dialling code: 01840
- Police: Devon and Cornwall
- Fire: Cornwall
- Ambulance: South Western
- UK Parliament: North Cornwall

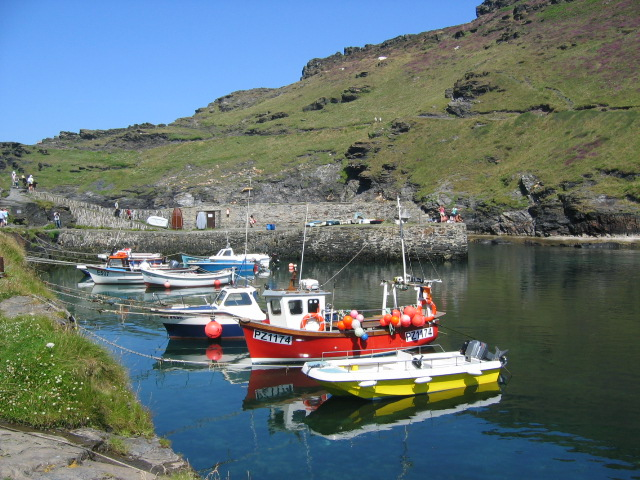
View from Boscastle harbour path leading to headland

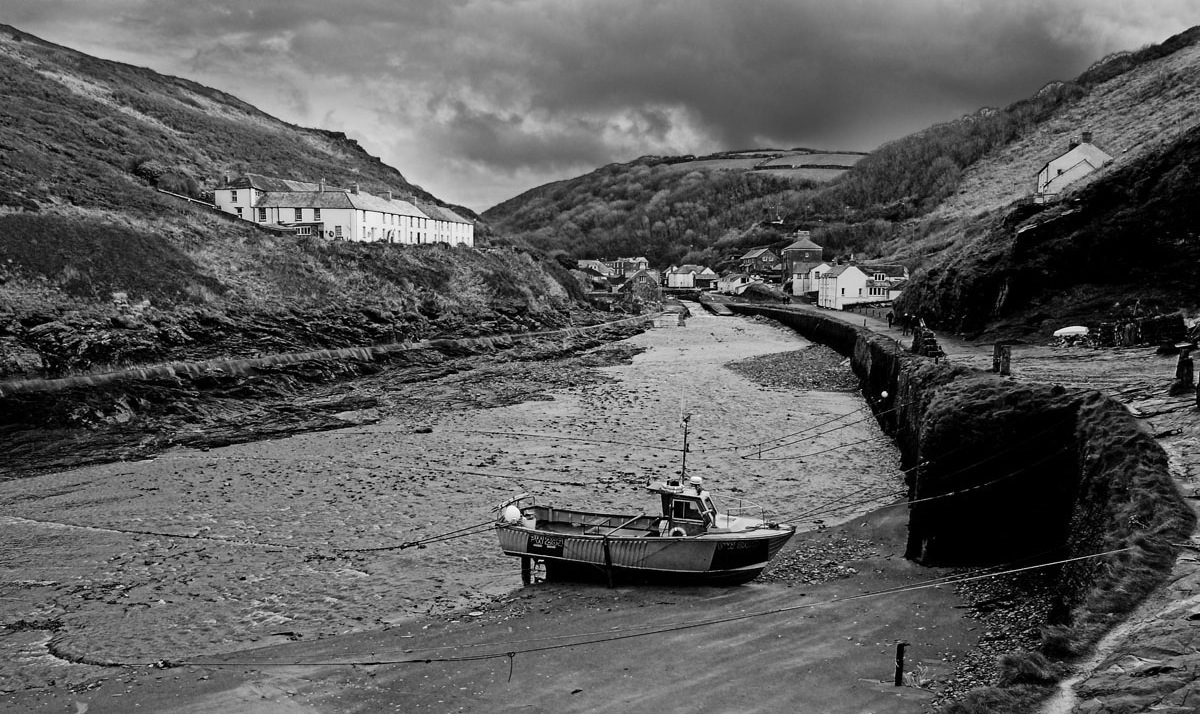
Boscastle Harbour

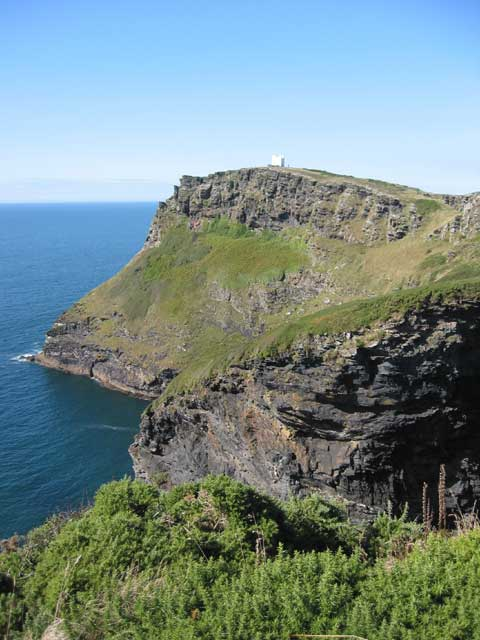
The Coastwatch hut above the harbour

Boscastle (Cornish: Kastelboterel) is a village and fishing port on the north coast of Cornwall, England, in the civil parish of Forrabury and Minster (where the 2011 Census population was included) . It is 14 miles (23 km) south of Bude and 5 miles (8 km) northeast of Tintagel. The harbour is a natural inlet protected by two stone harbour walls built in 1584 by Sir Richard Grenville and is the only significant harbour for 20 miles (32 km) along the coast. The village extends up the valleys of the River Valency and River Jordan. Heavy rainfall on 16 August 2004 caused extensive damage to the village.

Boscastle lies within the Cornwall National Landscape (formerly Cornwall Area of Outstanding Natural Beauty, or AONB). The South West Coast Path passes through the village.

== History ==
Boscastle takes its name from Bottreaux Castle, a now vanished motte and bailey built sometime between 1154 and 1189 by Sir William des Bottreaux. The Bottreaux family had been established here since around 1080. In 1312, Edward II granted them a charter allowing them to hold a market at Boscastle, along with a fair on the Feast of Saint James.

The 16th-century antiquary John Leland described the village as "a very filthy town and il kept". Boscastle harbour is a natural inlet protected by two stone harbour walls built in 1584 by Sir Richard Grenville (of the Revenge). It is the only significant harbour for 20 miles (32 km) along the coast. Boscastle was once a small port (similar to many others on the north coast of Cornwall), importing limestone and coal, and exporting slate and other local produce. By 1848 the population was 807.

In the early 20th century Boscastle hosted a street dance similar to the Helston Furry Dance, but it is unclear how old the tradition is or when this ceased.

Boscastle was once a centre for slate quarrying which remained a viable industry until around the turn of the 20th century. The remains of four quarries are situated in the cliffs between Boscastle Harbour and Trevalga.

=== Churches ===
The Rector of Boscastle is responsible for seven churches in the district: Forrabury (St Symphorian), Minster (St Merthiana), St Juliot, Lesnewth (St Michael and All Angels), Trevalga (St Petroc), Otterham (St Denis) and Davidstow (St David). St Juliot is of particular interest to devotees of the works of Thomas Hardy since he acted as the architect for the church's restoration in March 1870 and this is where he met his first wife, Emma Gifford, who was the Rector's sister-in-law. Their love affair was the inspiration for his novel A Pair of Blue Eyes and, later in life, some of his poetry.

A Seaside Parish

In 2004 British television channel BBC 2 began broadcasting A Seaside Parish, a weekly series focusing on the life of the newly appointed Rector of Boscastle, Christine Musser.

=== Tourism ===
The village, with its picturesque harbour, is a popular tourist destination. Among the attractions are the Museum of Witchcraft, Uncle Paul's Emporium, the Boscastle pottery shop, and access to the South West Coast Path.

Much of the land in and around Boscastle is owned by the National Trust, including both sides of the harbour, Forrabury Stitches, high above the Boscastle and divided into ancient "stitchmeal" cultivation plots, and large areas of the Valency Valley, known for its connections to Thomas Hardy.

The former harbour stables (part of the National Trust estate) are now a youth hostel run by YHA, popular with walkers. The National Trust runs a shop at the harbour, and a visitor centre in the Old Smithy.

Charles III, then Prince of Wales, visited Boscastle on 15 July 2019 to commemorate the anniversary of the Cornwall AONB and to visit a local Cornish hedge restoration project.

The Boscastle Breakdown step dance, The Boscastle & Tintagel Players concertinas, cello & stepping is included in the Topic Records compilation The Voice of the People.

The Wellington Inn is a 16th-century coaching inn near the harbour; its furnishings include church lamps which were donated by the architect Thomas Hardy and stained glass windows installed in 1846.

=== Boscastle floods ===
Flood of 2004

A flash flood on 16 August 2004 caused extensive damage to the village. Residents were trapped in houses, on roofs, in cars, and on the river's banks, and the village's visitor centre was washed away. Two Royal Air Force Westland Sea King rescue helicopters from Chivenor, three Royal Navy Sea Kings from Culdrose, one RAF Sea King from St Mawgan and one Coastguard S61 helicopter from Portland searched for and assisted casualties in and around the village. The operation was coordinated by the Aeronautical Rescue Coordination Centre based at RAF Kinloss in Scotland in the largest peacetime rescue operation ever launched in the UK. A total of 91 people were rescued, with no fatalities.

The cause of the flooding was over 60 millimetres (2.4 in) of rainfall (typically a month's rainfall) falling in two hours due to thunderstorms developing on a convergence line. The ground was already saturated due to the previous two weeks of above average rainfall; the drainage basin has many steep slopes, and has areas of impermeable slate causing rapid surface run-off. Boscastle is at the confluence of two rivers, Valency and Jordan; a large quantity of water arrived within a short space of time, causing the rivers to overflow. The flooding coincided with a high tide, worsening the storm's impact.

Around 50 cars were swept into the harbour and the bridge was washed away, roads were submerged under 2.75 metres (9 ft) of water, making communication effectively impossible until flood-waters subsided. The sewerage system burst, so for a range of health and safety reasons Boscastle was declared temporarily inaccessible. Homes, businesses and cars belonging to more than 1,000 people were swept away; income from tourism was lost, which affected livelihoods and the local economy; there were vast numbers of subsequent insurance claims.

Flood of 2007

Boscastle was flooded again on 21 June 2007 although the scale of destruction was not nearly as serious as in 2004.

== Sport ==
Boscastle Golf Club (now defunct) was founded in 1907. The club continued until the mid-1920s.

Boscastle and Crackington Pilot Gig Club formed in 2004 and row from Boscastle harbour, Port Gaverne and Upper Tamar Lake. They have three gigs; Torrent (named after the 2004 floods). Rival and Golden Gear.

Cornish wrestling prize tournaments, were held in Boscastle in the 19th century.
