= Bottreaux Castle =

Old castle in England

Coordinates: 50°41′09″N 4°41′31″W

Bottreaux Castle is a ruined motte-and-bailey castle in Boscastle, Cornwall. It was originally built in the 12th century and only earthworks remain today.

== History ==
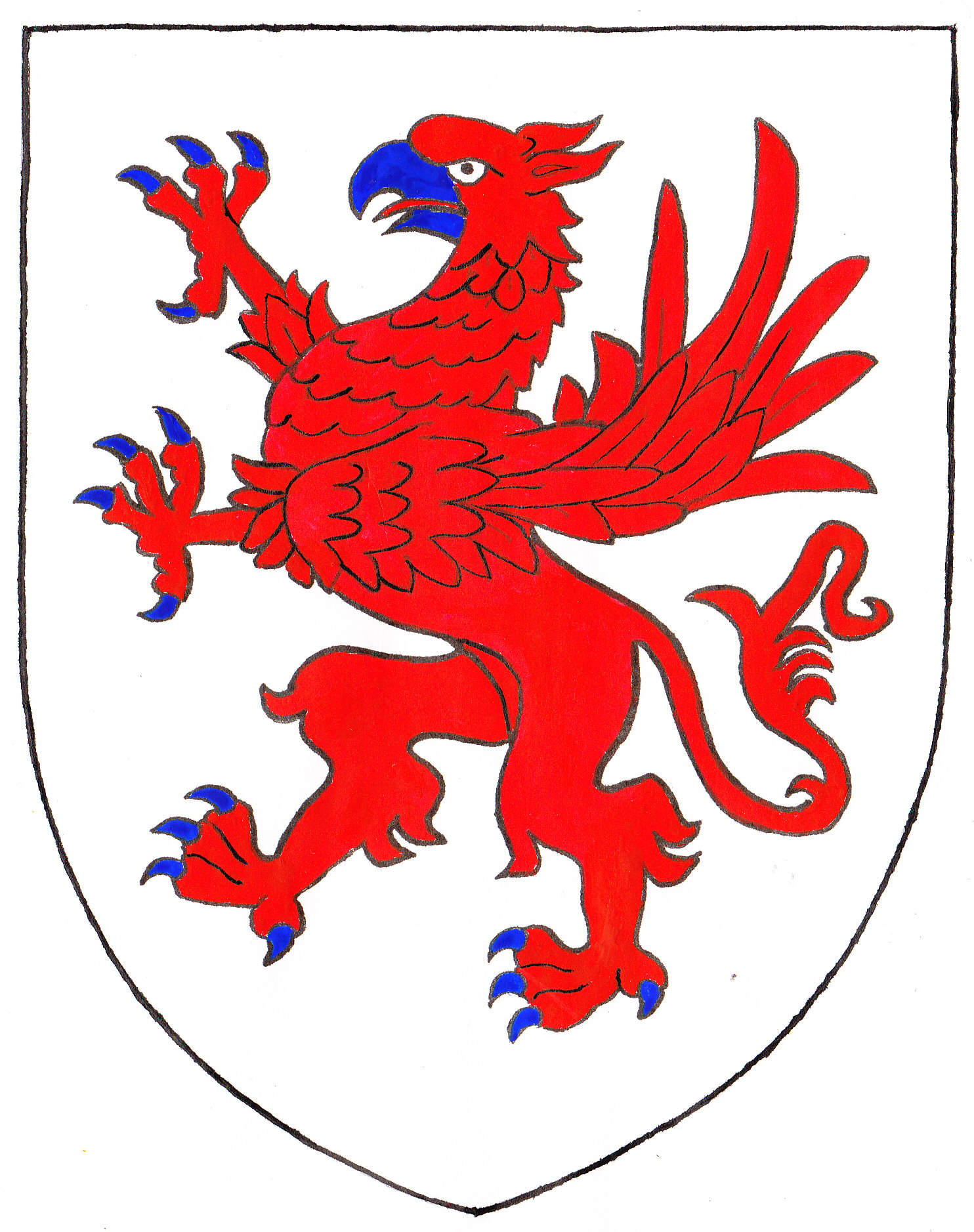
Arms of the Bottreaux family, the builders of the castle

Bottreaux Castle was likely built sometime between 1154 and 1189 (during the reign of Henry II) by Sir William des Bottreaux, though it does not actually appear in records until the 13th century. Its owners, the Bot(t)reaux family, were ennobled by Edward III as Barons Botreaux.

The last member of the Bottreaux family died in 1462, and the castle soon fell into decay. In 1478, William Worcester mentioned Bottreaux Castle only as a manor house. John Leyland visited the castle in 1538, but the castle was likely demolished before he visited; he commented on the ruins, calling them "far unworthie the name of a castel; the people there, call it the Courte". Around 1600, Richard Carew noted that it was once used as a unisex prison. He wrote:

The first place which heere offreth itselfe to sight, is Bottreaux Castle, seated on a bad harbour of the North sea, & suburbed with a poore market town, yet entitling the owner in times past, with the stile of a Baron, from whom, by match it descended to the L. Hungerford, & resteth in the Earle of Huntingdon. The diuersified roomes of a prison, in the Castle, for both sexes, better preserued by the Inhabitants memorie, then descerneable by their owne endurance, shew the same, heeretofore to haue exercised some large iurisdiction.

The castle was in ruins by 1769, and an 1852 survey by Maclaughlan found that although some walls were visible, only about half of the motte was visible. The site, on a steep spur overlooking the River Jordan, is now a public park, and a war memorial is present on the site of the castle. It was designated as a Scheduled Monument on 22 April 1974.
