= River Jordan, Cornwall =

River in Cornwall, England

Coordinates: 50.6848°N 4.6927°W

The River Jordan in Cornwall is a river and a tributary to the River Valency where it merges in the village of Boscastle.

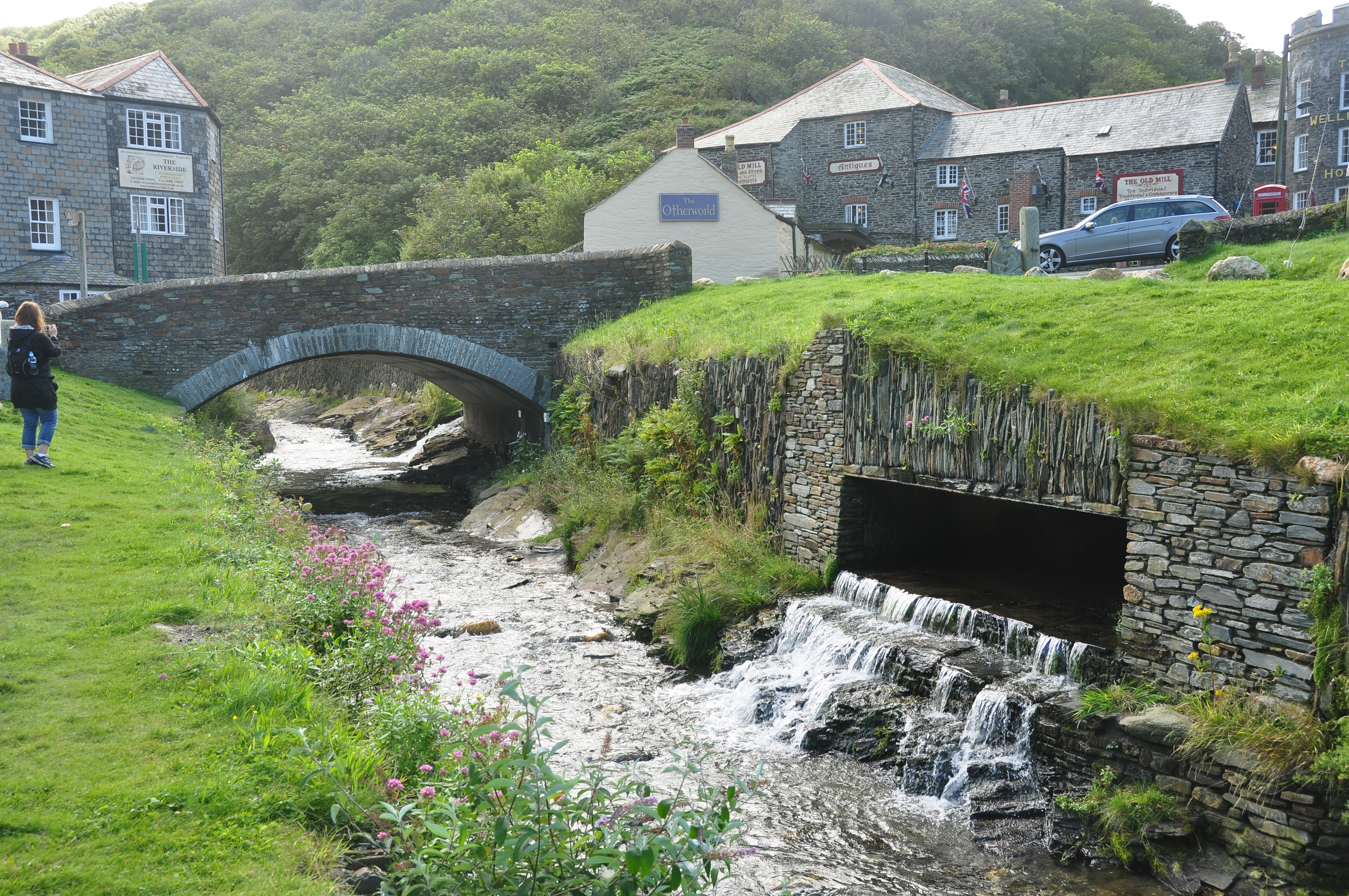
Boscastle
