= Forrabury and Minster =

Civil parish on the north coast of Cornwall, England

Coordinates: 50.684°N 4.692°W

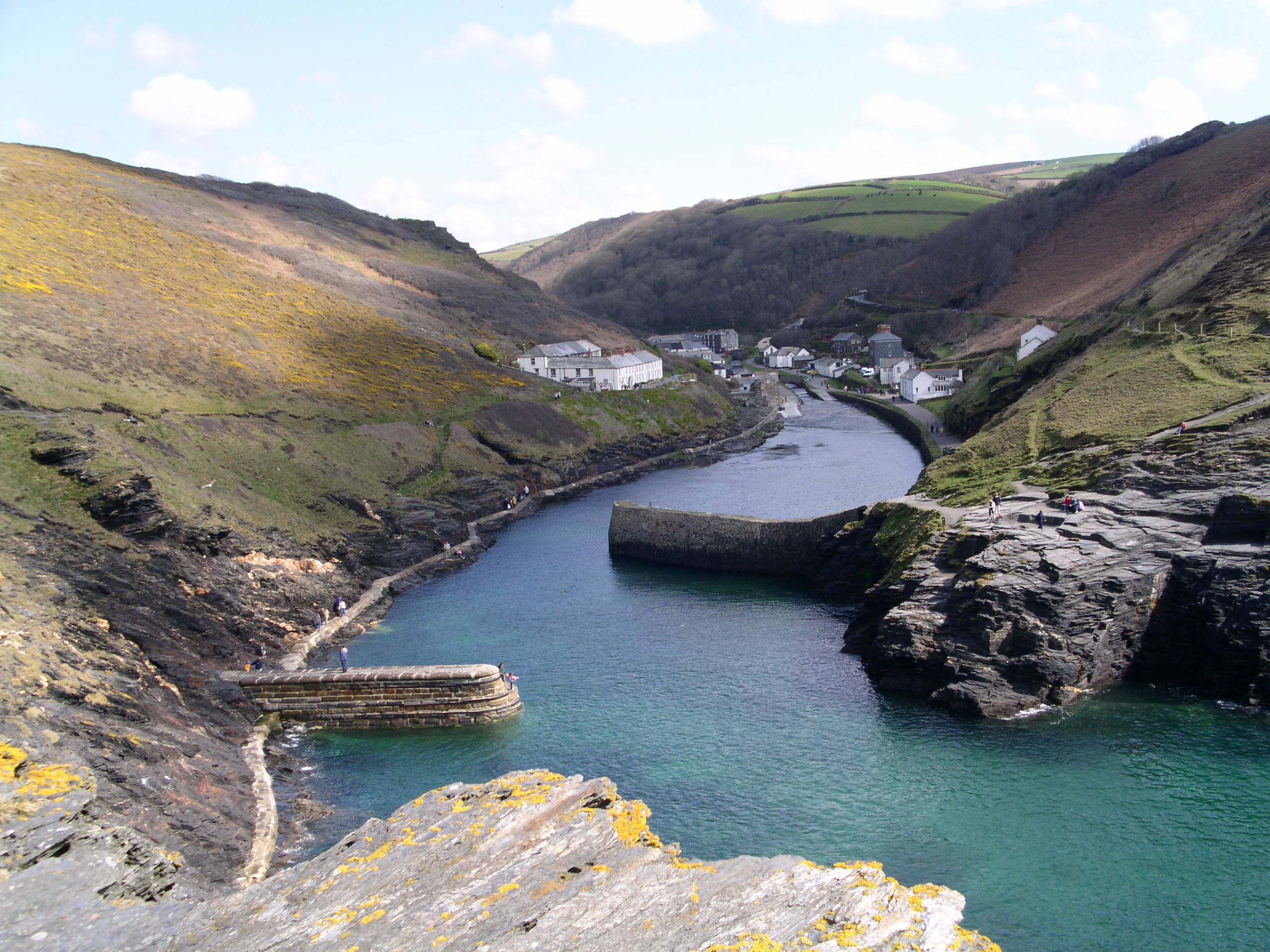
- The harbour at Boscastle

- Location within Cornwall
- Population: 838 (2011 census)
- Civil parish: Forrabury and Minster
- Unitary authority: Cornwall
- Ceremonial county: Cornwall
- Region: South West
- Country: England
- Sovereign state: United Kingdom

Forrabury and Minster is a civil parish on the north coast of Cornwall, England, United Kingdom. The parish was originally divided between the coastal parish of Forrabury and inland parish of Minster until they were united on the 1st of April 1919.

The parish was in the Registration District of Camelford. It is bounded to the north by the Atlantic; to the east by the parishes of St Juliot, Lesnewth and Davidstow; to the south by Camelford parish (ecclesiastical parish of Lanteglos by Camelford); and to the west by Trevalga parish. The population of Forrabury and Minster parish in the 2001 census was 888, which decreased slightly to 838 at the 2011 census.

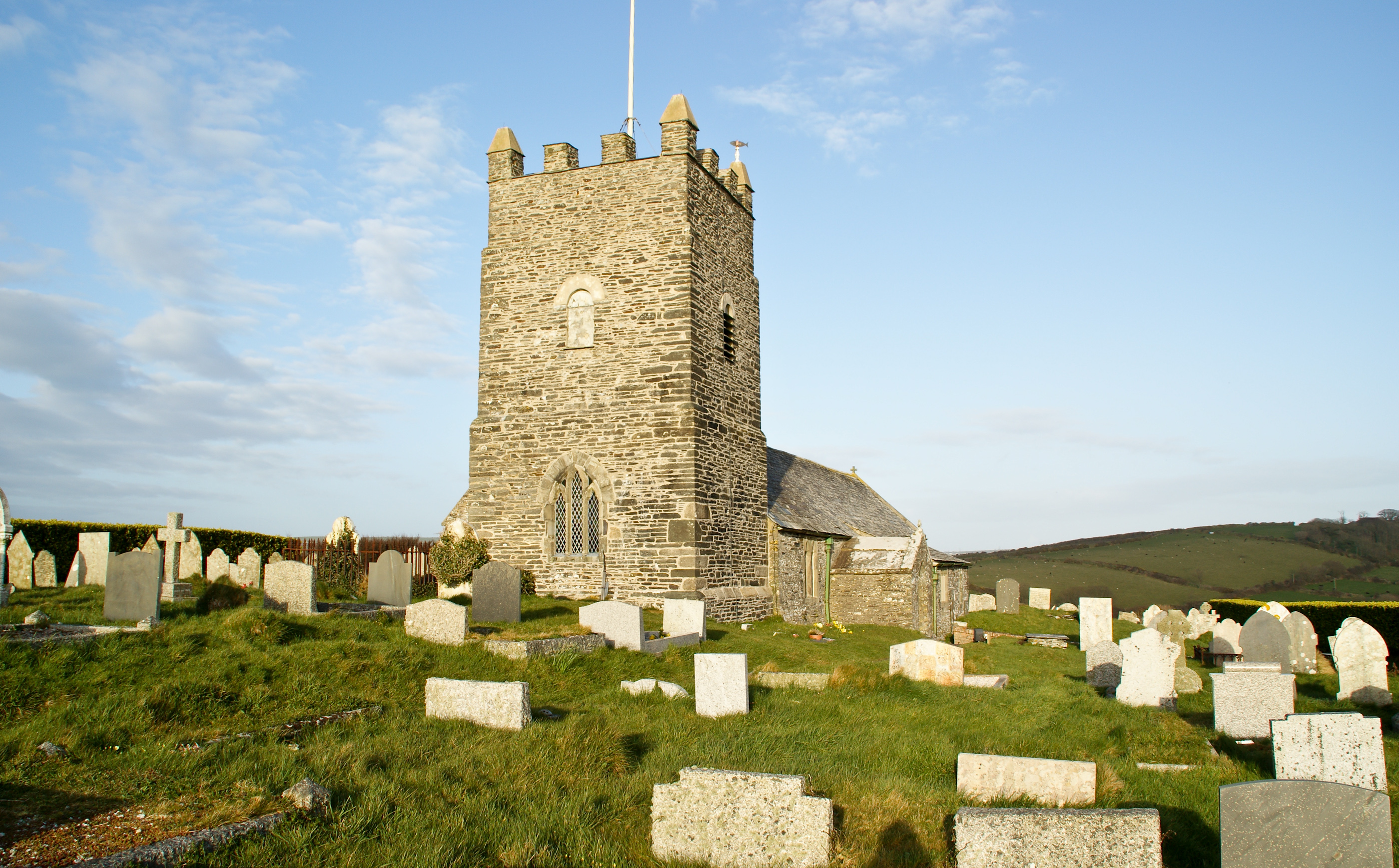
Forrabury Parish Church

== Settlements and churches ==
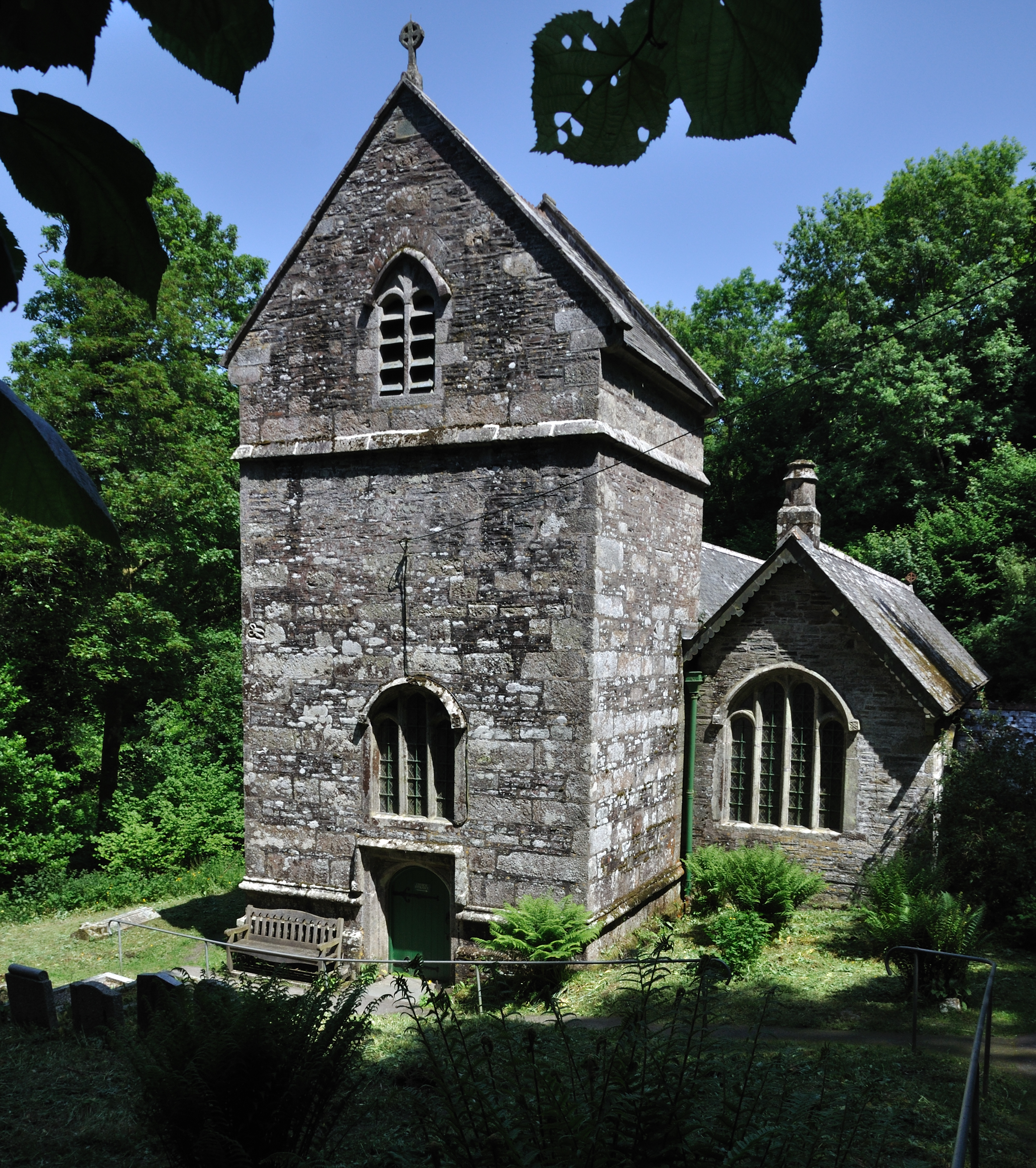
Minster Church

Boscastle is the principal settlement in the parish of Forrabury and Minster. It is 14 miles (23 kilometres) south of Bude and 5 miles (8.0 kilometres) north-east of Tintagel. Forrabury parish church, dedicated to St Symphorian, is in Boscastle at grid reference SX 095 908.

However, the mother church of Boscastle is dedicated to St Materiana and nestles among the trees of Minster Wood in the valley of the River Valency half-a-mile east of Boscastle at grid reference SX 110 904. The original Forrabury / Minster boundary crossed the river so the harbour end of the village was in Forrabury and the upriver area in Minster. The churches were established some time earlier than the settlement at Boscastle (in Norman times when a castle was built there). The Celtic name of Minster was Talkarn but it was renamed Minster in Anglo-Saxon times because of a monastery on the site. Until the Reformation St Materiana's tomb was preserved in the church. (Another spelling of her name sometimes used is 'Mertheriana' but the usual Latin form is Materiana.) In 1187 the advowson of Forrabury Church was granted to the newly founded Hartland Abbey by William de Botreaux of Boscastle, who also gave the Abbey the advowsons of other of his manors in Devon. For many years the Anglican parishes of Forrabury and Minster have been in the charge of a Rector who is responsible for a group of adjoining parishes as well as these. Minster Church was damaged by the flood of August 2004 and in the following year archaeological work was done at the church to obtain a clearer idea of the history of the building.

== Notable buildings and antiquities ==
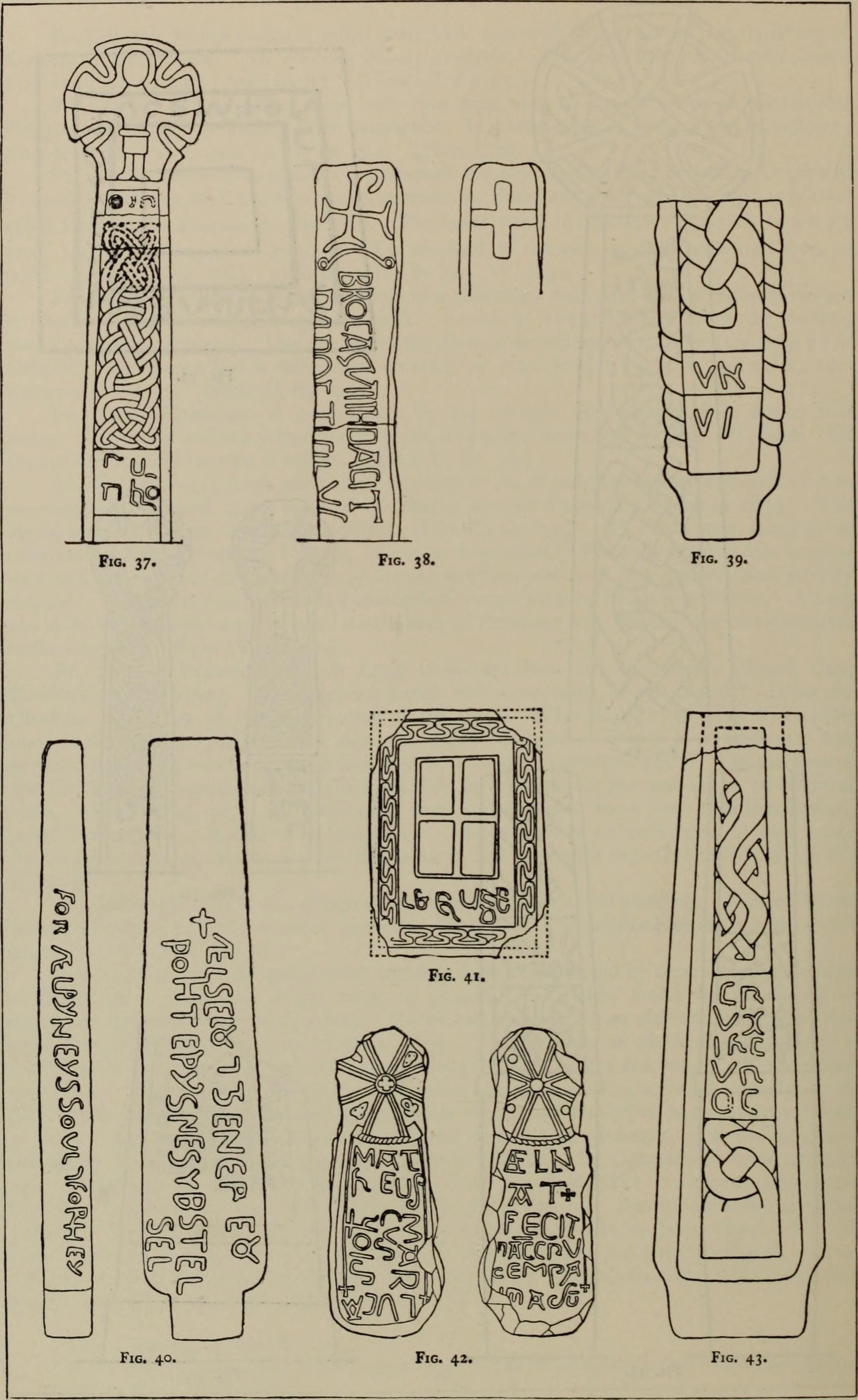
The cross on Waterpit Down (fig. 43) illustrated in The Victoria History of the County of Cornwall (1906)

Minster church was built in Norman times (some late medieval additions and restoration work carried out in the 19th century): it is listed Grade I. Forrabury church also has some Norman work but the tower was added in 1750. The Rev R. S. Hawker wrote a poem on "The Bells of Forrabury": it was based on a local legend arising from the absence of a peal of bells in the tower. At Welltown in Forrabury parish is a manor house dating from about 1640 and at Worthyvale and Redevallen in Minster parish are two manor houses also of the 17th century. Not far from Worthyvale is an inscribed stone (Latini [h]ic iacit filius Macari = Latin son of Macarus lies here). This stone is popularly known as King Arthur's Grave due to the erroneous identification of Slaughter Bridge with the site of Camlann. At Waterpit Down (on the road towards Launceston in Minster parish) are the remains of a cross probably from the 10th century. Camelford railway station (now occupied by the British Cycling Museum) was built in 1893 and was closed in 1966. (Though named after nearby Camelford it was in Minster parish.)

== Views in Forrabury and Minster ==
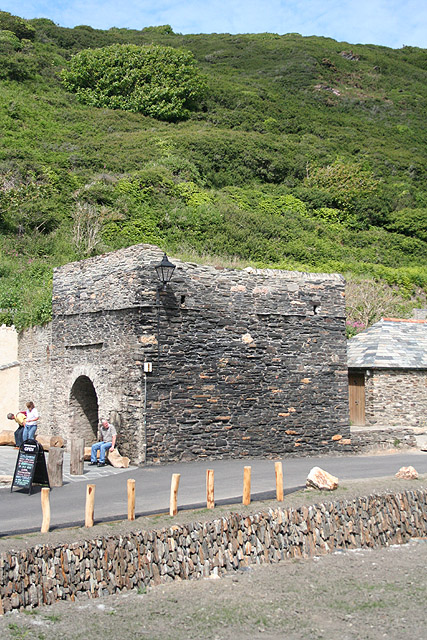
Forrabury and Minster: old lime kiln, Boscastle

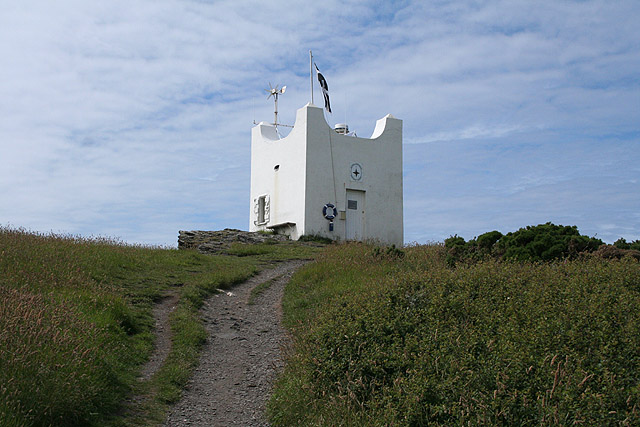
Forrabury and Minster: Coastwatch station, Willapark

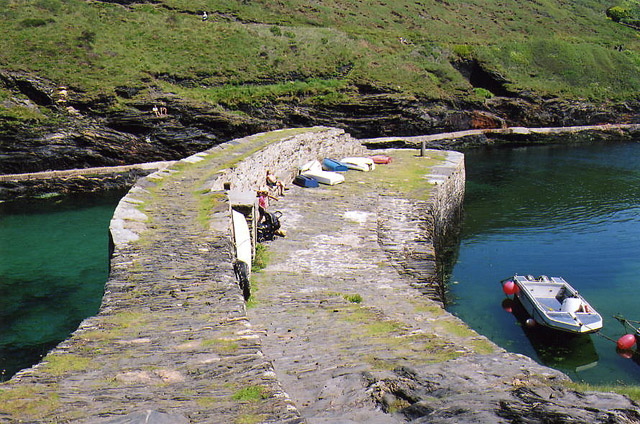
Forrabury and Minster: Boscastle pier

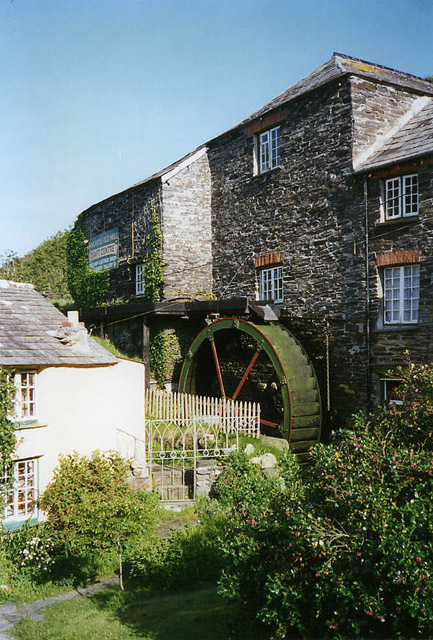
Forrabury and Minster: Boscastle Old Mill or Bridge Mill

== Bibliography ==
- Maclean, Sir John, The Parochial and Family History of the Parishes of Forrabury and Minster in the County of Cornwall, 1873 (part of MacLean's Parochial and Family History of ... Trigg Minor)
- Armstrong, W. J. C., A Rambler's Guide to Boscastle; Together with St Juliot, Lesnewth [and] Trevalga; 2nd ed., 1931, privately printed at Boscastle
