= Boscastle Slate Quarries =

Series of disused coastal quarries in Cornwall, England

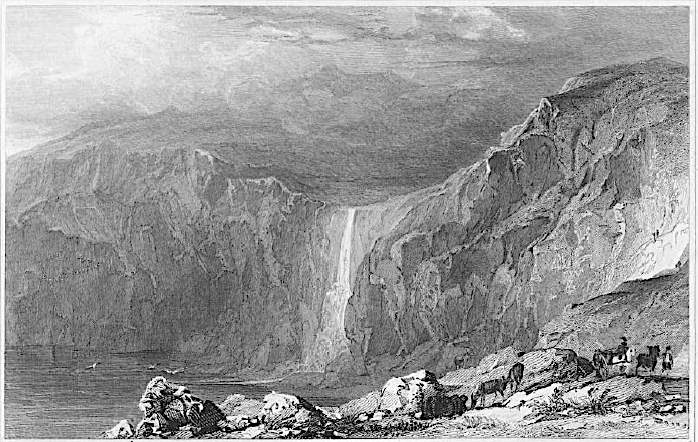
"Waterfall and Stone Quarry, near Boscastle"; T. Allom, 1832

Boscastle Slate Quarries are a series of disused coastal quarries between Willapark and Trevalga on the north coast of Cornwall, South West England.

== The quarries ==
- California Quarry
- Welltown Quarry
- Grower Quarry
- Boscastle Quarry

=== California Quarry ===
50.686°N 4.705°W The quarry is cut into the cliffs just south of Willapark. It is also known as Swanser Quarry. The quarry can be identified by a stone strongpoint overhanging the cliff. On this will have stood a wooden platform supporting a horse-operated whim which hoisted blocks to the top of the cliff. Various ruined buildings can be found on the cliff top including shelters and splitting sheds where thin roofing slates were produced. Old photographs show a small railway with its iron wagons, though this has since disappeared.

=== Welltown Quarry ===
The quarry cuts a right angle into the cliffs just north of the inlet known as Grower Gut.

=== Grower Quarry ===
The quarry hacks a deep notch into the cliffs forming an inlet known as Grower Gut. It is also called Growa Quarry. Just offshore is Grower Rock which gives the quarry its name.

=== Boscastle Quarry ===
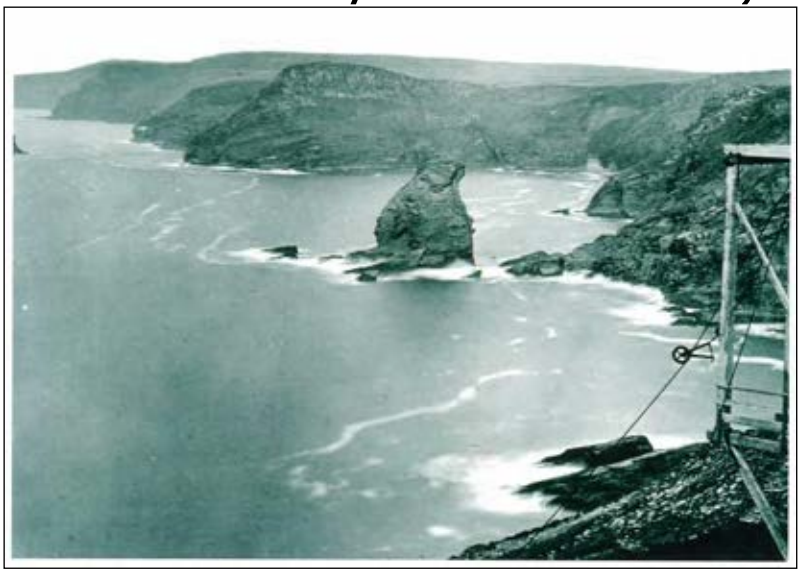
Loading derrick above Boscastle Slate Quarry, Trevalga looking over to Grower Quarry

The quarry cuts into the cliffs just north of Trevalga. A well preserved stone horse whim can be seen on the cliffs above the quarry from the South West Coast Path

== The stone ==
In Boscastle, Lower Carboniferous slates sit on top of Upper Devonian. The boundary between the two is at Gower Quarry. The most valuable slates were blue and green and were found at the base of the cliffs. The stone forms part of what is known as the Barras Nose formation.

== Quarrying ==
Removing rock from the quarry was a hazardous occupation. Men were lowered down the cliffs by a system of cables. The men working these quarries were in constant danger, with weather their worst enemy. If stormy or frosty weather stopped them working they did not get paid.

== Trilobites ==
During 1961, California Quarry was extensively researched and was found to be rich in fossils. In particular, two species of trilobite were found: Cyrtosymbole cf. drewerensis and Cyrtosymbole (Waribole) sp. Below the quarry and only exposed in fallen blocks on the foreshore, a third trilobite species can be found – Cyrtosymbole verneuill.

== In Art and Literature ==
In Fisher's Drawing Room Scrap Book, 1833, Thomas Allom's picture of Boscastle Waterfall and Quarry (above) is accompanied by a poetical illustration by Letitia Elizabeth Landon, in which she reflects on the noble buildings that are able to be created from the products of the quarries.
