= Aeronautical Rescue Coordination Centre =

United Kingdom coordination centre for search and rescue aircraft

Aeronautical Rescue JRCC-AR
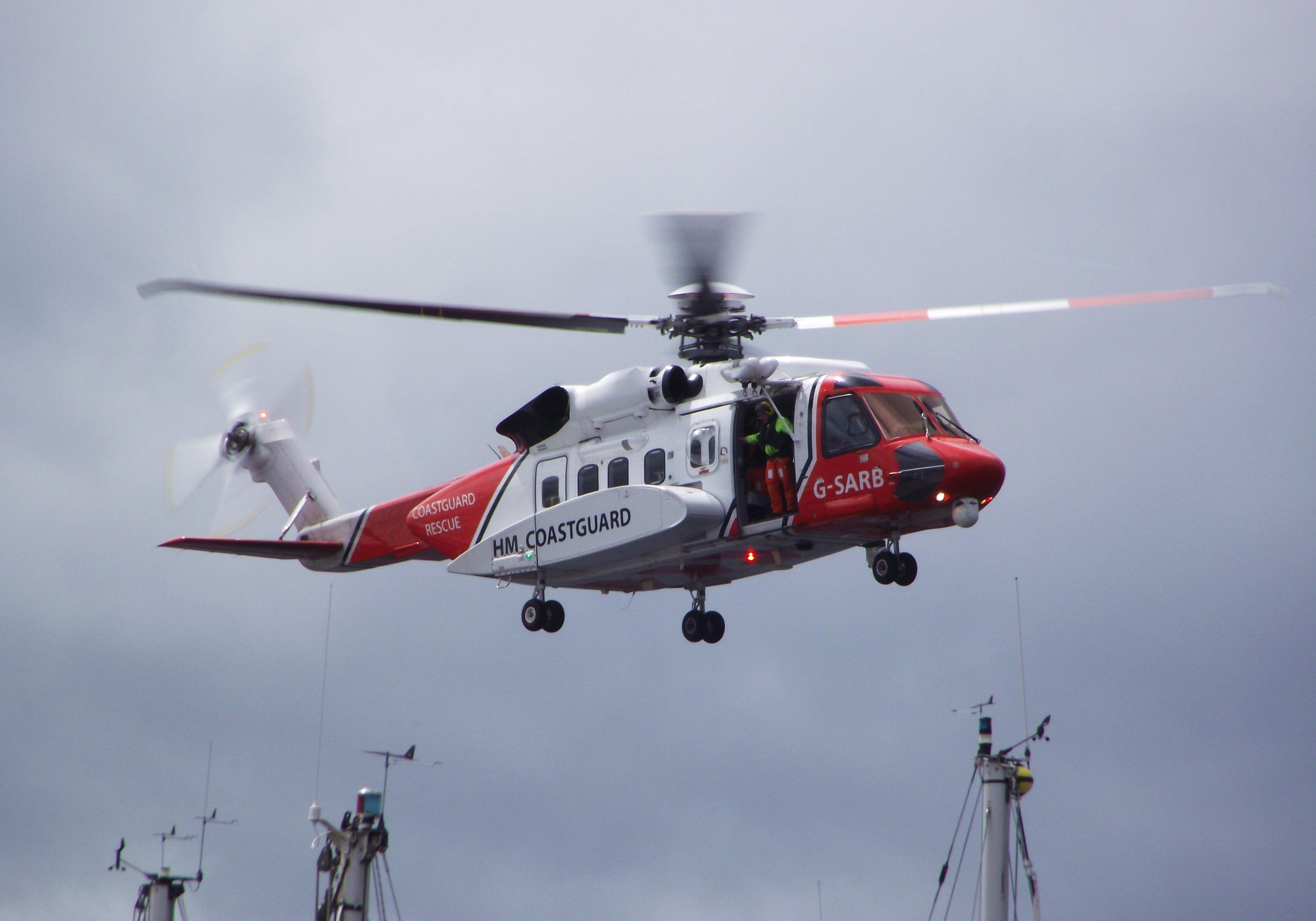
- An HM Coastguard Sikorsky S-92 search and rescue helicopter
- Active: 1997 – 2016 (Royal Air Force); 2016 – present (HM Coastguard)
- Country: United Kingdom
- Branch: Maritime and Coastguard Agency
- Role: Civil maritime and aeronautical search and rescue coordination
- Part of: His Majesty's Coastguard
- Location: National Maritime Operations Centre, Fareham, Hampshire, England

Insignia
- Abbreviation: ARCC

Aircraft flown
- Helicopter: AgustaWestland AW189; Sikorsky S-92
- Patrol: Beechcraft Super King Air; Piper PA-31 Navajo

The United Kingdom's Aeronautical Rescue Coordination Centre (ARCC) is based at the Joint Rescue Coordination Centre (JRCC), Fareham, Hampshire.

== Structure ==
The centre is responsible for tasking all Maritime & Coastguard Agency Search and Rescue (SAR) helicopters and fixed wing aircraft. The civil ARCC has no authority to task RAF mountain rescue teams. It monitors rescue incidents in the United Kingdom Search and Rescue Region (UK SRR), which extends to 30 degrees west in longitude, and from 45 to 61 degrees north latitude (as far north as just south of the Danish Faroe Islands), excluding the Republic of Ireland (Ireland SRR).

Sikorsky S-92 helicopters can operate in excess of 250 miles from their base, with an endurance of over four hours.

AgustaWestland AW189 helicopters can operate in excess of 200 miles from their base, with an endurance of over four hours.

Beechcraft Super King Air B200 aircraft can operate in excess of 400 miles from their base at Doncaster, with an endurance of over five hours. For longer range SAR incidents the aircraft can rapidly deploy to other airfields.

Piper PA-31 Navajo Panther aircraft can operate in excess of 200 miles from their base in Doncaster, with an endurance of over four hours. Again, the aircraft can be forward deployed to other airfields around the UK.

Fareham has no helicopter squadrons, however it controls rescue helicopters and fixed wing aircraft based at:

=== Helicopters ===
- Stornoway Airport on the Isle of Lewis in the Outer Hebrides
- Sumburgh Airport, south of Lerwick in the Shetland Islands
- Lee-on-Solent, four miles west of Portsmouth in Hampshire
- Humberside Airport
- Inverness Airport
- Caernarfon Airport
- Lydd Airport
- St Athan
- Prestwick Airport
- Newquay Airport

=== Fixed Wing Aircraft ===
- Doncaster Sheffield Airport

== History ==
The RAF Search and Rescue Force began in 1941, mainly rescuing aircrew from ditched aircraft. On 12 December 1997, the two control centres in Plymouth and Edinburgh were combined into one site at RAF Kinloss. During its time as part of the RAF its motto was Constant Endeavour.

In March 2016 ownership of tasking search and rescue aircraft transferred from the RAF to HM Coastguard based at the National Maritime Operations Centre (NMOC) in Fareham, Hampshire.

== Preparedness ==
Coastguard helicopters and fixed wing aircraft are on standby 24 hours a day, 365 days a year, to assist those in difficulty, both at sea and over land. Helicopter crews are at 15 minutes notice from 8am until 10pm, extending to 45 minutes notice from 10pm until 8am overnight. Fixed wing crews are at 45 minutes notice from 8am until 10pm, extending to 60 minutes notice from 10pm until 8am overnight.

== Control centre ==
The control centre is staffed by HM Coastguard, who operate long-range HF and satellite communications equipment. And tasking of helicopters and fixed wing aircraft following requests from the emergency services. With an area of almost 1 million square miles, the ARCC deals with incidents across the whole of the UK out to halfway across the North Atlantic.

== Personnel ==
ARCC tasking staff come from a variety of backgrounds within the aviation and military community and work very closely with the Coastguard, Police, Ambulance Authorities and Fire & Rescue Services.

== Incidents ==
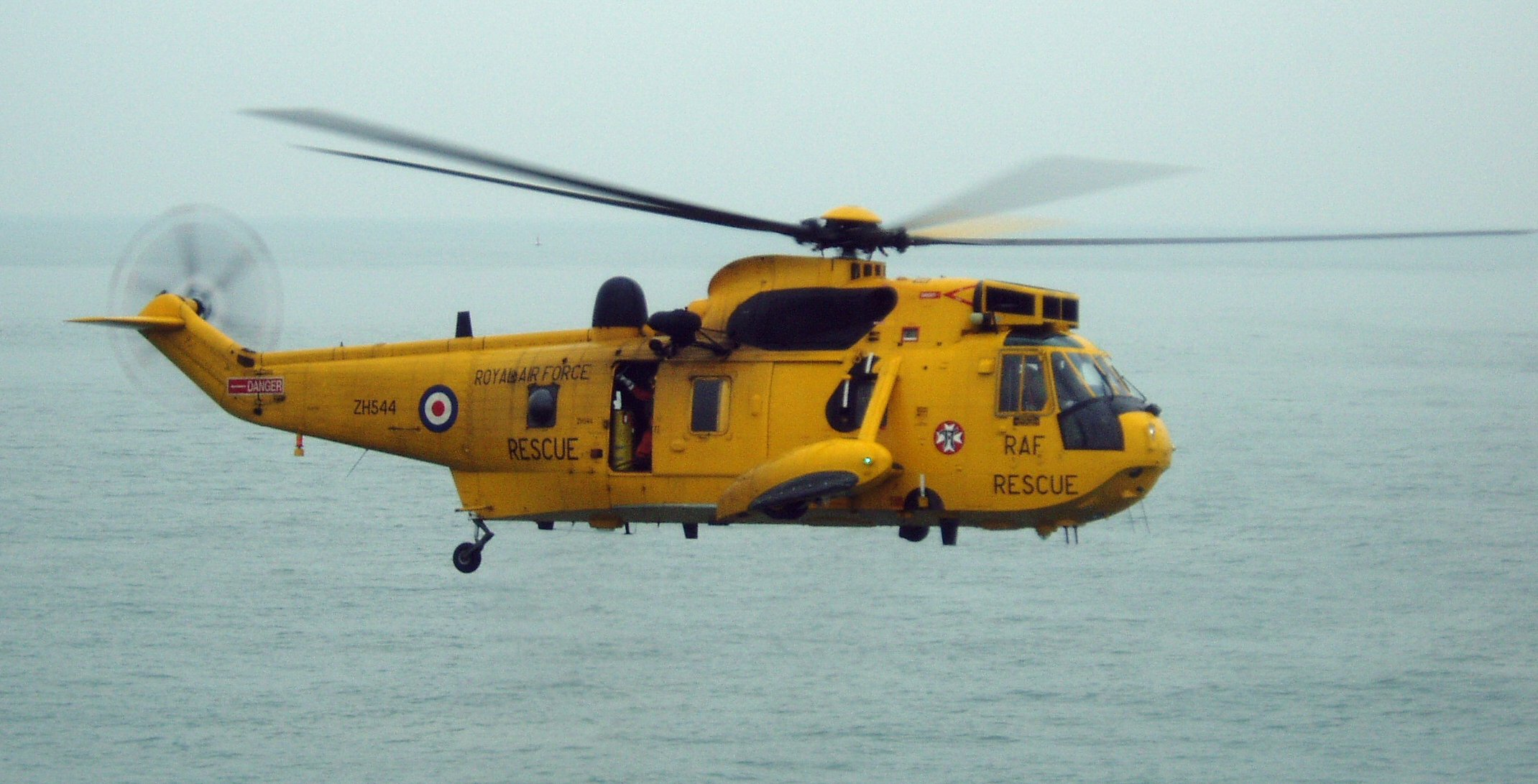
RAF Sea King rescue helicopter

During recent years the ARCC has assisted with rescues during the Sheffield floods, the Grayrigg Rail Crash and the Boscastle floods, and deals with over 2000 incidents each year.

== UK Mission Control Centre ==
The JRCC is also home to the UK Cospas-Sarsat Mission Control Centre (UKMCC). This is the centre that detects emergency beacons within the UK Search and Rescue Region (SRR) using an advanced computer system. Maritime distress beacon information is passed to the Coastguard authorities but terrestrial alerts are investigated by the UKMCC, often requiring the use of SAR fixed wing aircraft and helicopters to pinpoint the beacon's position.
