= Otterham =

Village in Cornwall, England

Otterham: Cornish: Prasotri
- Location within Cornwall
- Population: 228 (Civil Parish, 2001)
- OS grid reference: SX 168 907
- Civil parish: Otterham
- Unitary authority: Cornwall
- Ceremonial county: Cornwall
- Region: South West
- Country: England
- Sovereign state: United Kingdom
- Post town: CAMELFORD
- Postcode district: PL32
- Dialling code: 01840
- Police: Devon and Cornwall
- Fire: Cornwall
- Ambulance: South Western
- UK Parliament: North Cornwall

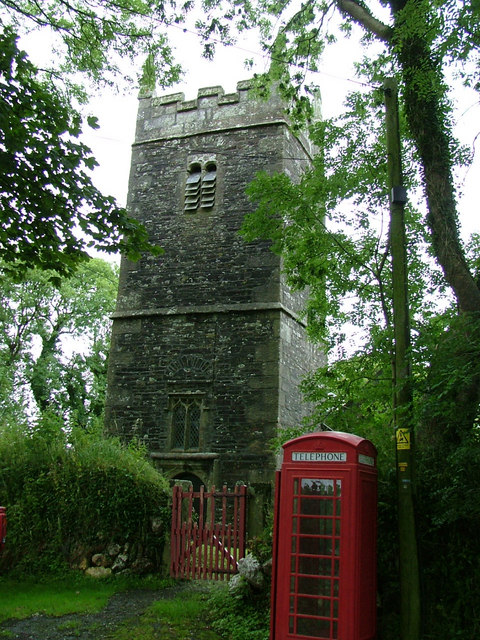
Otterham Church

Otterham (Cornish: Prasotri) is a village and a civil parish in north Cornwall, England, United Kingdom. The village is situated approximately ten miles (16 km) south of Bude and six miles (9.7 km) north of Camelford.

Otterham Mill, Otterham Down and Otterham Station (see below) are neighbouring settlements to Otterham village; all take the name from the River Ottery which rises in the parish.

The parish is in the Hundred of Lesnewth and Deanery of Trigg Major. It is in the Registration District of Camelford and belongs to the Boscastle group of Anglican parishes. Otterham parish is bounded to the north by St Gennys, to the east by Warbstow, to the south by Davidstow and to the west by St Juliot. The parish is rural with small hamlets and farmsteads spread fairly evenly across it: the population of the parish in the 2001 census was 228.

The parish church of St Denis at grid reference SX 168 907 is in Otterham village and has a 40 ft tower housing three bells. The church was established during the Norman period, but the north transept was removed in 1889.

== Otterham Station ==
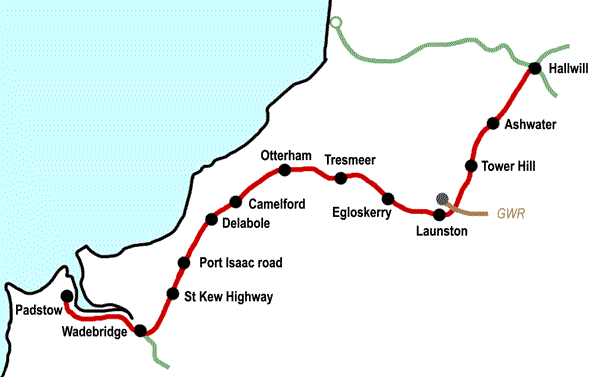
Map of the stations on the North Cornwall Railway

Otterham Station (50.675°N 4.613°W) is a settlement one mile south-west of Otterham village at grid reference SX 154 893.

Otterham Station is located at the junction of the A39 trunk road and the B3262 minor road. The settlement grew round the site of the former station on the North Cornwall Railway which closed in October 1966.

Hendraburnick Down (1009 ft) is south of Otterham Station and there are a number of Bronze Age barrows (including Tich Barrow) on the Down. The source of the River Camel is also on Hendraburnick Down.

== See also ==
- North Cornwall Railway
