= 2004 Boscastle flood =

Flooding event in England

Coordinates: 50.69044°N 4.69505°W

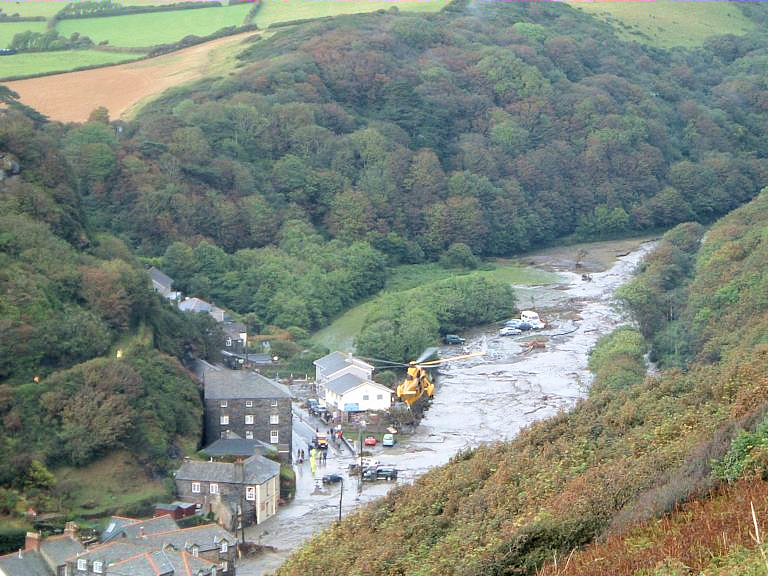
- An RAF Westland Sea King Helicopter flying over Boscastle During the flood

Meteorological history
- Date: 16 August 2004

Overall effects
- Damage: Extensive
- Areas affected: Boscastle; Crackington Haven

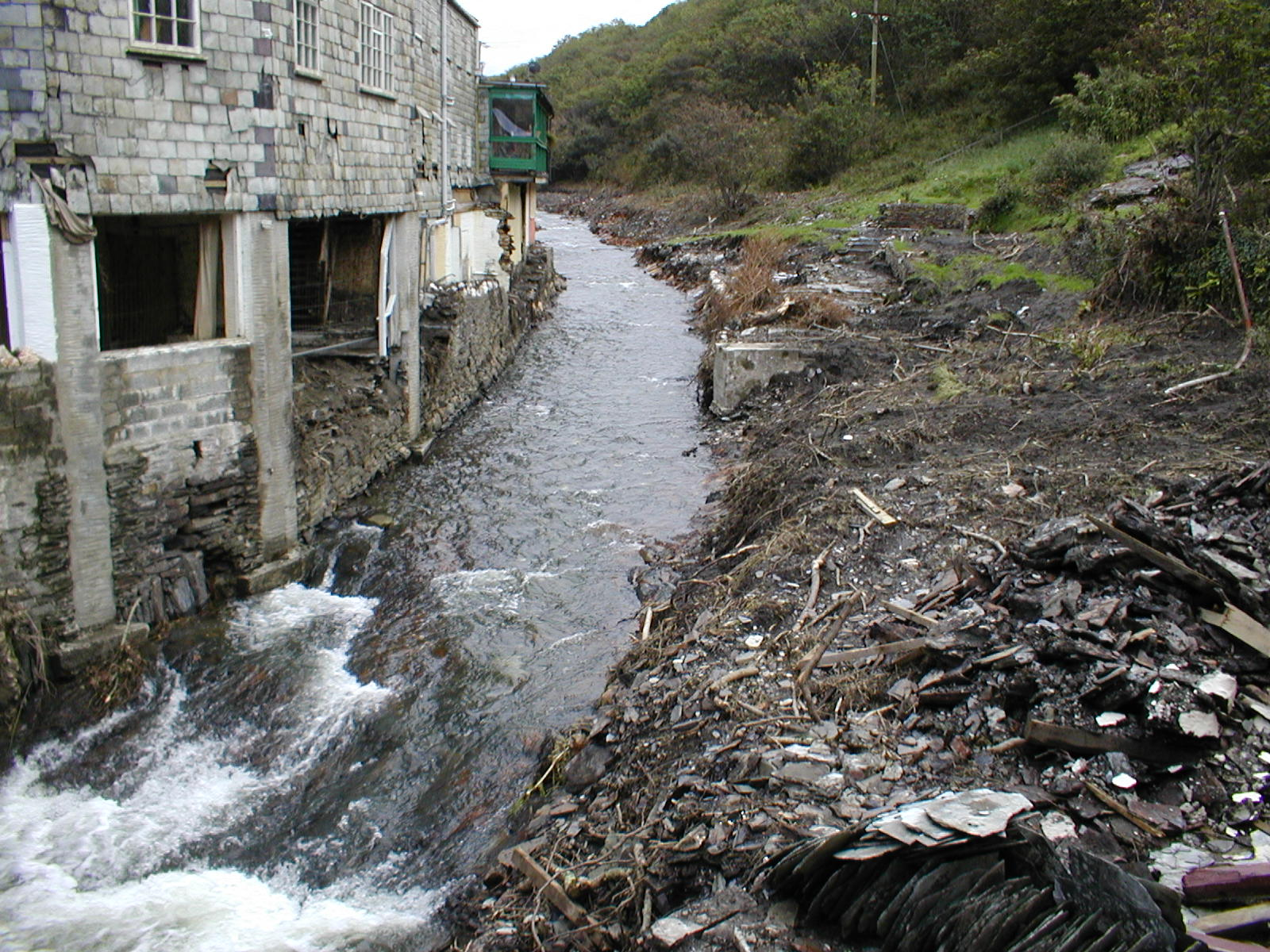
Looking upstream from the bridge after the flood

The 2004 Boscastle flood occurred on Monday 16 August 2004 in the villages of Boscastle and Crackington Haven on the north-west coast of Cornwall, England, UK. The villages suffered extensive damage after eight hours of exceptionally heavy rain caused flash floods. The flooding in Boscastle was filmed and extensively reported, but the floods in Crackington Haven and Rocky Valley were not mentioned beyond the local news. The floods were the worst in local memory. A study commissioned by the Environment Agency from hydraulics consulting firm HR Wallingford concluded that the flooding was among the most extreme ever experienced in Britain. The cost of the damage was estimated to be £50 million.

The last time Boscastle had suffered notable flooding was in 1996, as a result of Hurricane Lili. Floods are recorded in 1847, 1957, on 3 June 1958 (one man drowned) and on 6 February 1963 during the Winter of 1962–63 in the United Kingdom. On 16 August 1952, 52 years to the day before Boscastle's 2004 flood, the small town of Lynmouth, 50 miles (80 km) to the north-east on the north coast in Devon, near Exmoor, had suffered extensive damage in a catastrophic flood in which 34 people lost their lives.

== Causes of the Boscastle flood ==
At midday on 16 August 2004, heavy thundery showers had developed across the South West "as a result of a weak disturbance" to the northeast of the United Kingdom. A "great black wedge of cloud," a "seven-mile deep flank of cumulonimbus", appeared in a clear blue sky and took up position on the high ground over the Valency valley above Boscastle. According to David Crichton, Visiting Professor at the Benfield Hazard Research Centre at University College, London, "Westerly winds carrying the remnants of Hurricane Alex, which had picked up vast amounts of water from the Atlantic, hit the peninsula of Cornwall from the sea to the north and south and converged over the hills, pushing clouds up to 40,000 feet high and producing a prolonged stationary thunderstorm." Warm air which was picking up moisture as a result of residual heat from the Atlantic Ocean had moved towards the Cornish coast as prevailing winds. When the winds met the topographically vertical coast they experienced a strong updraft, which caused internal moisture to rise and then cool into a string of storm clouds. Convergence and coalescence of the enhanced moisture levels produced heavy rainfall.

By 1:15pm the rain was torrential. 185mm (7 inches) of rain fell on high ground inland from Boscastle and at the peak of the downpour, at about 15:40 GMT, 24.1 mm of rain (almost one inch) was recorded as falling in 15 minutes at Lesnewth, 2.5 miles (4 km) up the valley. In Boscastle, 89 mm (3.5 in) of rain was recorded in 60 minutes. The rain was very localised: Otterham and Lesnewth, both a few miles inland from Boscastle, recorded 24-hour totals of 200 mm and 185 mm respectively on the day, whereas four of the nearest 10 rain gauges showed less than 3 mm of rain in the same period.

The torrential rainfall caused a 2 m (7 ft) rise in river levels in one hour. By 3:30pm the river was level with its banks; by 3:45pm it was a raging torrent and had burst its banks. By 4pm cars were being carried down in the flood from the visitors' car park. The force of thousands of tons of water carrying rocks and debris started to demolish buildings. A 3 m (10 ft) wave, believed to have been triggered by water pooling behind debris caught under a bridge and then being suddenly released as the bridge collapsed, surged down the main road into the village. The first lifeboat on the scene, from Port Isaac, encountered a wall of water pushing about 50 cars ahead of it down to the sea. Residents and visitors were trapped in buildings which were being battered by the torrent, in cars and in trees. The Valency river was now a 50-yard-wide, 15 feet deep torrent.

Water speed was over 4 m/s (10 mph), more than enough to cause severe structural damage. It is estimated that 20,000,000 cubic metres (5.3×10^{9} US gal) of water flowed through Boscastle. The steep-sided valley and saturated surface ensured a high amount of surface run-off. Changes in farming practice in the area may also possibly have contributed, and a reduction in trees and hedges higher up the valley would have allowed water to flow through more quickly. The peak flow was about 140 m^{3}/s, between 5:00pm and 6:00pm BST. The chance of this or a greater flood happening in any one year is about 1 in 400. The probability each year of the heaviest three-hour rainfall is about 1 in 1300, although rainfall probability is not the same as flood probability.

== Impact of the flood ==
No one died in the flood; the worst injury recorded was a broken thumb. 79 cars, five caravans, six buildings and several boats were washed into the sea. 60 properties were flooded in Boscastle and approximately 40 others in Canworthy Water, Bude, Helebridge and Crackington Haven. Approximately 100 homes and businesses were destroyed and some had to be demolished. Trees were uprooted and debris was scattered over a large area. Four bridges were washed away. Emergency staff at Cornwall County Council received more than 100 calls in the afternoon, rising to 170 in the early evening, from residents and visitors trapped by the water. In an operation lasting from mid-afternoon until 2:30am, a fleet of seven Westland Sea King helicopters, from RAF Chivenor, Royal Naval Air Station at Culdrose, RAF St Mawgan near Newquay, and a Coastguard helicopter from Portland, Dorset, rescued about 150 people who were clinging to trees and the roofs of buildings and cars. No major injuries or loss of life were reported. The estimated cost of damage was £15 million. The disaster became worldwide news within hours and made headlines in countries including the US, Canada, Australia, New Zealand, France, India and China. The next day, Falmouth Coastguards had to broadcast warnings to shipping in the area because there were cars, fridges and other items floating up the coast between Boscastle and Hartland Point.

== Work since the flood ==
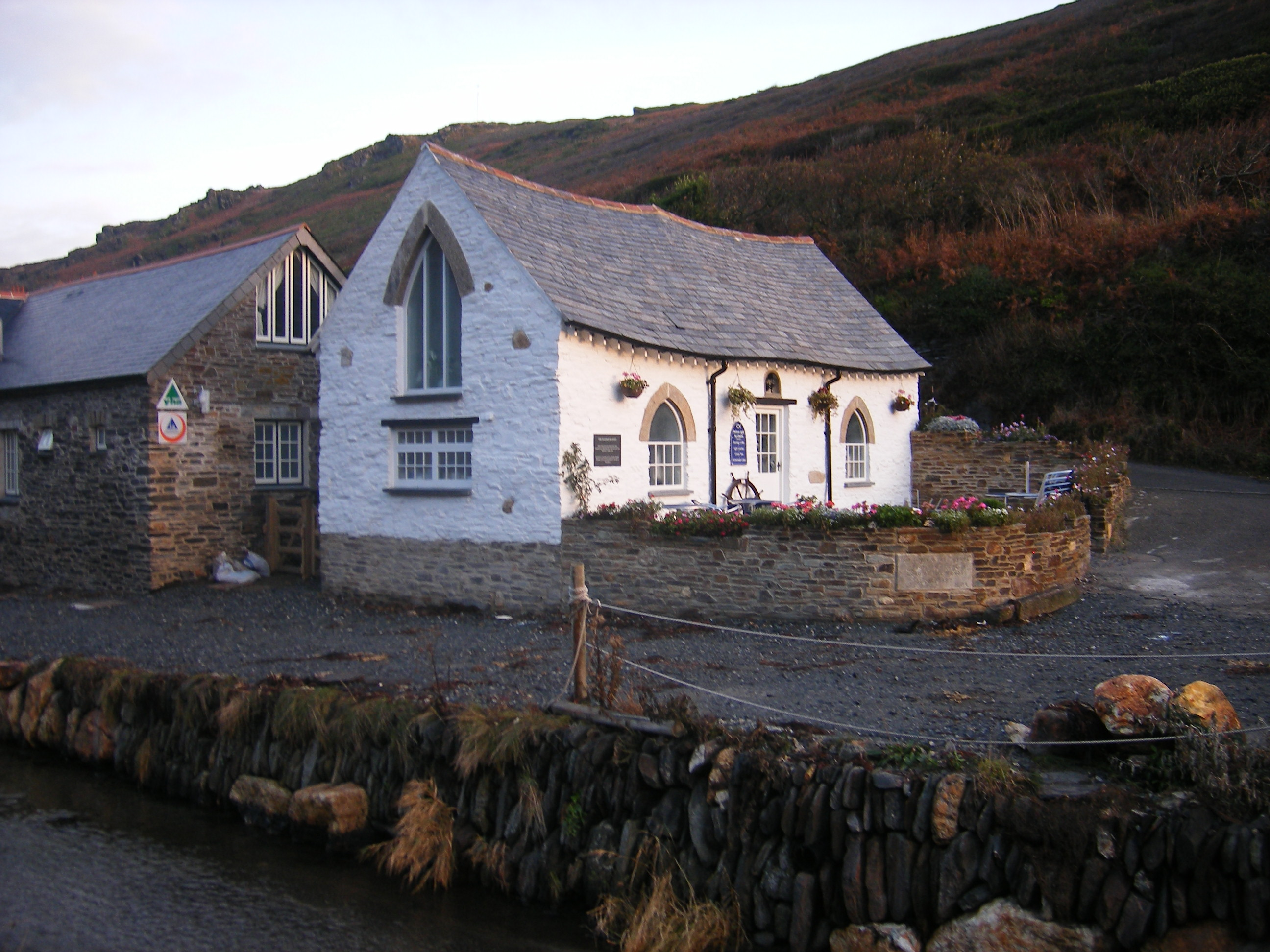
The rebuilt Harbour Light in October 2006, now used as tea rooms. The shop is over the river.

Most of the ensuing repair work took place in the winter season (October–May), during the off-season. The car park was reduced to half-capacity (120 spaces) in winter, in order for works to take place, and returned to 240 spaces in the summer.

=== 2004 ===
- August: Buildings searched, buried cars removed from harbour, trees removed, roads cleared, B3263 bridge temporary concrete parapets installed.
- 20 August: Boscastle Coast Path closed
- 14 September: Work started on the overflow culvert for the Valency River.
- December: Overflow culvert work completed. Also many hard sticks were inserted into the ground so it would create a barrier against the flood.

=== 2005 ===
- Early 2005: Most shops and restaurants re-open
- Boscastle power system renewed
- Water supply restored
- Food supply restored
- The flood defences were increased
- Defences improved strongly
- Rebuilding and repairs are mostly finished

=== 2006 ===
- 30 October: Work on two underground pumping stations for the sewage treatment scheme began.
- 1 November: Work started to widen and lower the river channel to increase capacity.
- December: A new visitor centre opened, in the former Harbour Restaurant, bought by the National Trust.
- December: The car park level was raised and extended, reducing the risk of cars being washed away.

=== 2007 ===
- January: Work started on the 'gateway building' next to the car park, to contain toilets, a bus shelter, and information boards.
- April: Work stopped on gateway building due to problems with planning permission, and the building being built taller than expected.
- 21 June: Boscastle reflooded, although it was not nearly as bad as during the 2004 floods.
- September: Work restarted on Gateway Building, after planning permission is approved to lower the height of the building
- October: Work started on rebuilding an old culvert at the top of the village, to allow more water to flow through in periods of heavy rain.
- October: Work started on installing the pipes for the new sewage treatments works, in the harbour area (between the Lower and Upper bridges).
- 12 November: The main road in the harbour area was closed, from the bridge to the car park, while Cormac started work on new wider pavements, and Carillion installed pipes under the road for the new sewage treatment works.
- 14 December: The main road in the harbour area was reopened and temporary traffic lights put in place.
- 18 December: The new lower bridge was installed.

=== 2008 ===
- January: Work on improving the harbour pavements completed. Work on rebuilding the culvert next to the petrol station completed.
- February: Work began on renewing the culvert in Dunn Street, to allow more water through in times of heavy rain.
- March: The Harbour area road was resurfaced. Work on rebuilding the culvert in Dunn Street completed.
- April: Old Lower Bridge was demolished, and the new Lower Bridge was brought into use.

== The lower bridge ==
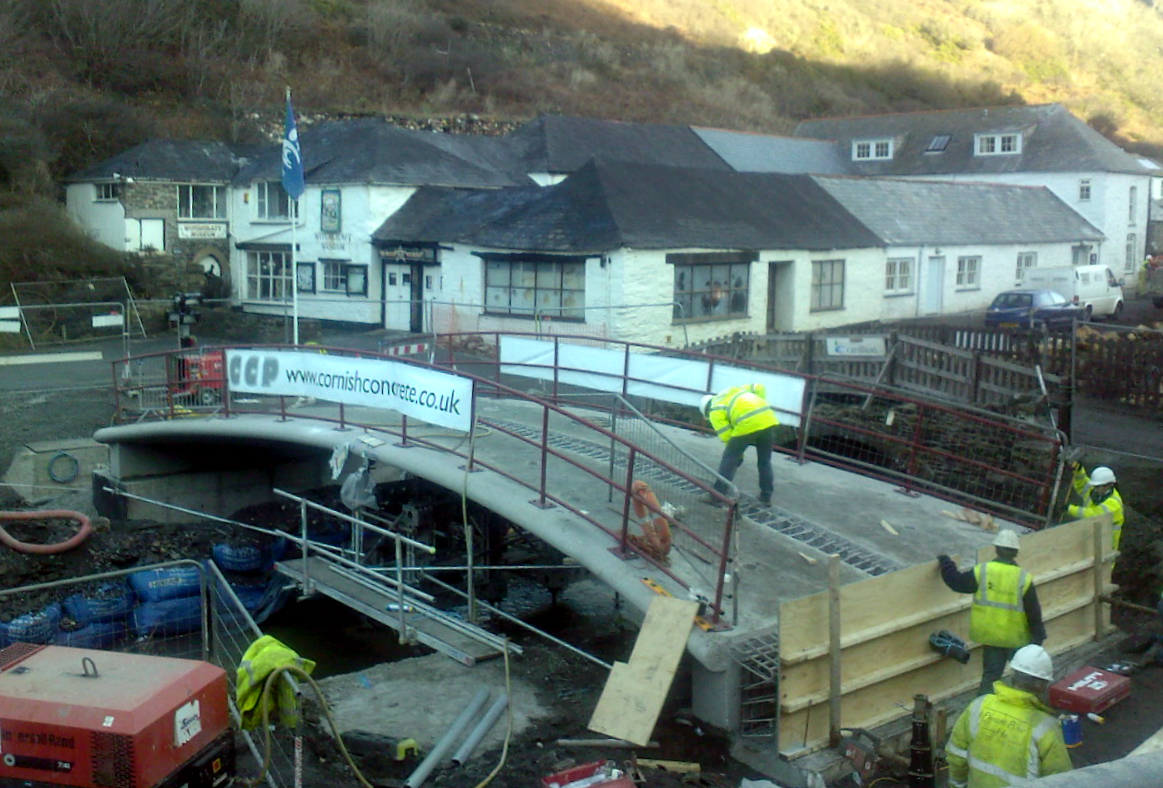
The New Lower Bridge, taken on 20 December 2007

During the flood of 2004, 14 cars became lodged beneath the old stone bridge causing a huge backlog of flood water and debris, which added to the damage caused in the surrounding area.

The main structure of the lower bridge survived the flood but the stone walls did not, and were washed away. On 1 May 2005, at the official reopening of the village, wooden fences were used on the bridge as temporary replacements. The bridge originally had a concrete plaque on it saying "This bridge is the private property of the lord of the manor, August 1887". It was lost during the flood, but was recovered from the harbour in good condition. This bridge has since been replaced with a new one.

The new bridge, a few metres further down the river, was installed on 18 December 2007, and was made by Cornish Concrete, a company based near Truro. The main arch was made from reinforced concrete with metal railings. The old bridge, which was over 100 years old, was demolished in early April 2008.

== Mini flood, 21 June 2007 ==
Boscastle was flooded again on 21 June 2007, although not as badly as in 2004. After a week of steady rain every day and an afternoon of intense localised rainfall, a small flood developed after 30mm of rain fell in one hour. Roads were flooded in the area and in the village, most of the water coming from the surrounding saturated fields. Many drains had become blocked. Roads around the Tintagel, Camelford and Davidstow area were closed to stop people visiting the village. River levels were alarmingly high but the banks contained the water, although the many culverts of the River Jordan overflowed on to the villages roads. The new storm culvert joining the River Jordan to the River Valency was at full capacity but did not flood. Services and organisations called in included:

- Fire crews from Bude, Delabole and Launceston to pump out the water from properties
- Crews to unblock the blocked up drains in the village
- The Environment Agency
- The Police and Council
- Helicopters from RNAS Culdrose and RMB Chivenor were on stand-by
- Boscastle Coast Guard

The Environment Agency's flood defences which had been installed after the 2004 flood worked and kept the water in the river channel. A few properties in the village were flooded to 3 ft (1 m) by water flowing down the streets, rather than from the river flooding, although the damage was not nearly as bad as in 2004. The two main roads (B3266, B3263) were blocked with flood waste and debris, which was cleared and the roads reopened the following morning. The Environment Agency looked at the culverts around the village and will change them all to modern drainage

== See also ==
- List of natural disasters in the United Kingdom
