= Lesnewth =

Village in Cornwall, England

Coordinates: 50.683°N 4.647°W

Lesnewth: Cornish: Lysnowydh
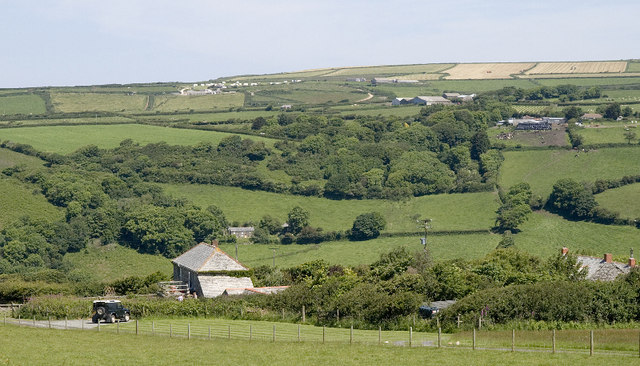
- Typical South-West England complex hedgerows patterns in part of the rolling Valency valley in the civil parish.

- Location within Cornwall
- Population: 60 (Civil Parish, 2001)
- OS grid reference: SX131903
- Civil parish: Lesnewth
- Unitary authority: Cornwall
- Ceremonial county: Cornwall
- Region: South West
- Country: England
- Sovereign state: United Kingdom
- Post town: BOSCASTLE
- Postcode district: PL35
- Dialling code: 01840
- Police: Devon and Cornwall
- Fire: Cornwall
- Ambulance: South Western
- UK Parliament: North Cornwall

Lesnewth (Cornish: Lysnowydh) is a civil parish and village in Cornwall, England, United Kingdom. It is about six miles east of Tintagel Head and two miles east of Boscastle.

The parish is bounded on the north by St Juliot (where the 2011 census population is included.), on the east by St Juliot and Davidstow, on the south by Davidstow, and on the west by Minster, Cornwall. It is a small sparsely populated parish set in farmland with only a few houses, farms and a church. Lesnewth manor is mentioned in the Domesday Survey of 1086, as Lisniwen. Lesnewth was also the name of one of ten ancient administrative shires of Cornwall: see Lesnewth (hundred).

Lesnewth lies within the Cornwall Area of Outstanding Natural Beauty (AONB).

== Notable buildings ==
The oldest buildings of Lesnewth include the Church, the Rectory, the Mill and Penpol, the latter of which is believed to be the original farmhouse to the surrounding north facing valley side. These buildings date back over 400 years, although there is believed to have been settlement in this area and on the opposing side of the Valency Valley for over 1000 years. The Church of St Michael was in part rebuilt by J. P. St Aubyn about 1865, though the tower itself is mediaeval.

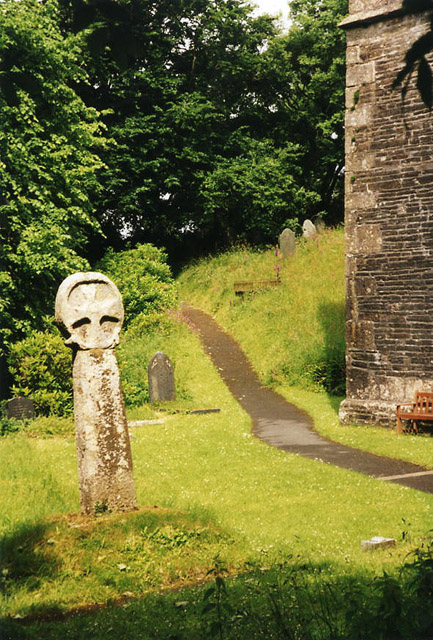
The cross in the churchyard

There is a Cornish cross in Lesnewth churchyard which consists of an ancient cross head mounted on a modern shaft.

== Etymology ==
The name is of Cornish origin and means 'New Court' (that is, a chieftain's estate): the 'Old Court' was at Helstone near Camelford, once known as Helston-in-Trigg in distinction to Helston-in-Kerrier.
