= River Valency =

River in north Cornwall, England

Valency
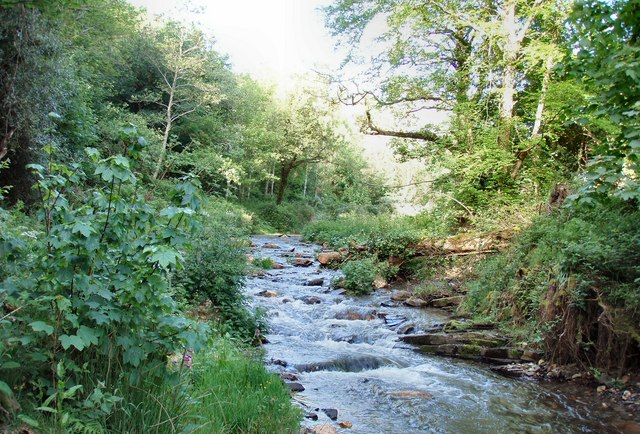
- River Valency at Newmills

Location
- Country: England
- Region: Cornwall

Physical characteristics
- Source
  - location: near Otterham Station
  - coordinates: 50.6701°N 4.6178°W
  - elevation: 275 m (902 ft)
- Mouth: Atlantic Ocean
  - location: Boscastle
  - coordinates: 50.6921°N 4.6993°W
  - elevation: 0 m (0 ft)
- Length: 8.3 km (5.2 mi)

The River Valency (Cornish: Dowr an Velinji) is a short river in north Cornwall, UK, with many small tributaries. After running past Lesnewth it cuts a valley before entering the Atlantic Ocean at the harbour of the village of Boscastle. One of its tributaries is the Jordan, which runs 2 kilometres (1.2 mi) north before joining the Valency in Boscastle just before the B3263 road bridge.

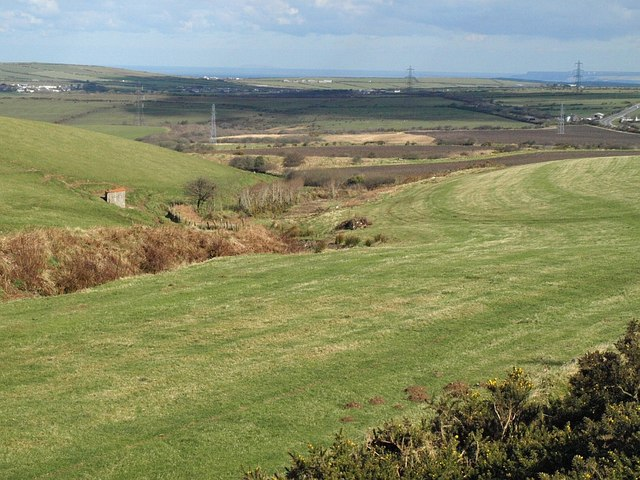
Source of the Valency

The Valency valley is steep-sided and the sides of the lower section are wooded. The valley has been flooded many times, most seriously in the Boscastle flood of 2004 when significant channel erosion occurred. (Heavy rainfall for 7 hours over a wide area in the afternoon of 16 August 2004 led to severe flooding and structural damage.) The agricultural use and fast drainage within the catchment areas of the Valency and Jordan are related to the extent of the Boscastle flooding.

== Etymology ==
The name has been explained as a corruption of the Cornish Melinjy (i.e. Melin-Chy = Mill-house) from the mill which existed in medieval times.
