= Trevalga =

Hamlet and civil parish in Cornwall, England

Coordinates: 50.678°N 4.717°W

Trevalga: Cornish: Trevelgi
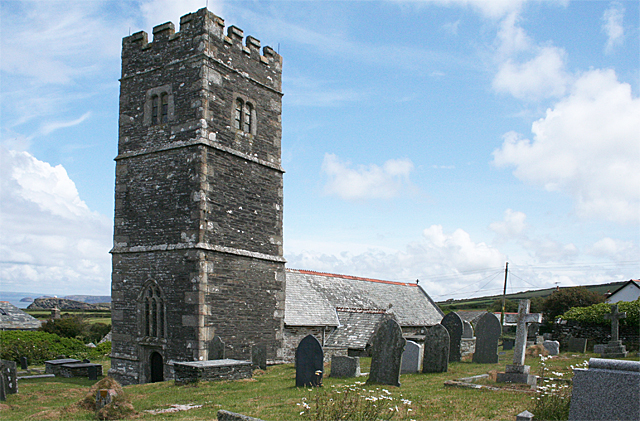
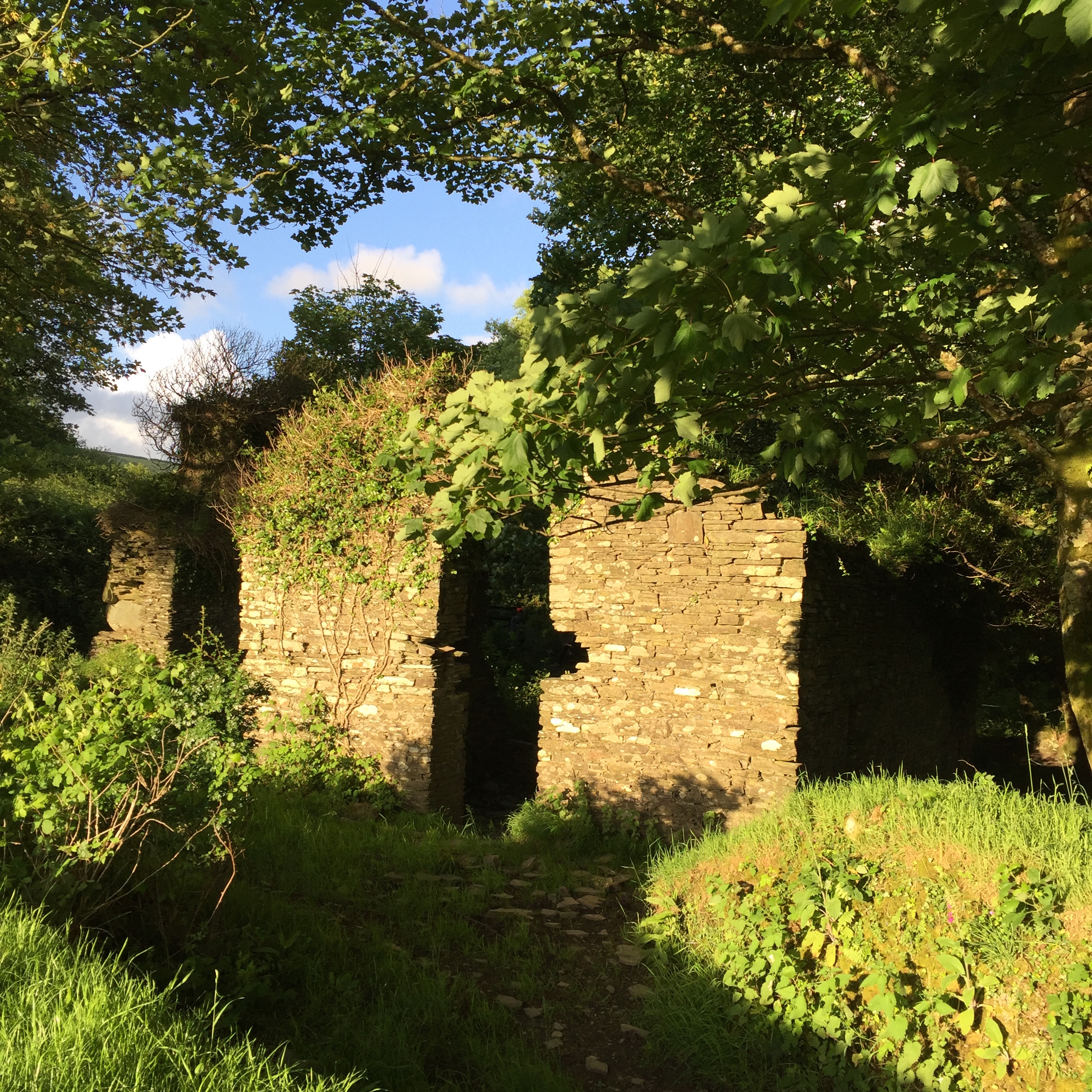
- St Petroc's Church Ruins of Trevalga Mill

- Location within Cornwall
- Population: 71 (Civil Parish, 2011)
- OS grid reference: SX082900
- Civil parish: Trevalga
- Shire county: Cornwall
- Region: South West
- Country: England
- Sovereign state: United Kingdom
- Post town: BOSCASTLE
- Postcode district: PL35
- Dialling code: 01840
- Police: Devon and Cornwall
- Fire: Cornwall
- Ambulance: South Western
- UK Parliament: North Cornwall

Trevalga (Cornish: Trevelgi) is a coastal civil parish and hamlet in north Cornwall, England, United Kingdom. The parish is bounded on the north by the Celtic Sea, on the southeast by Forrabury and Minster parish and on the west by Tintagel parish.

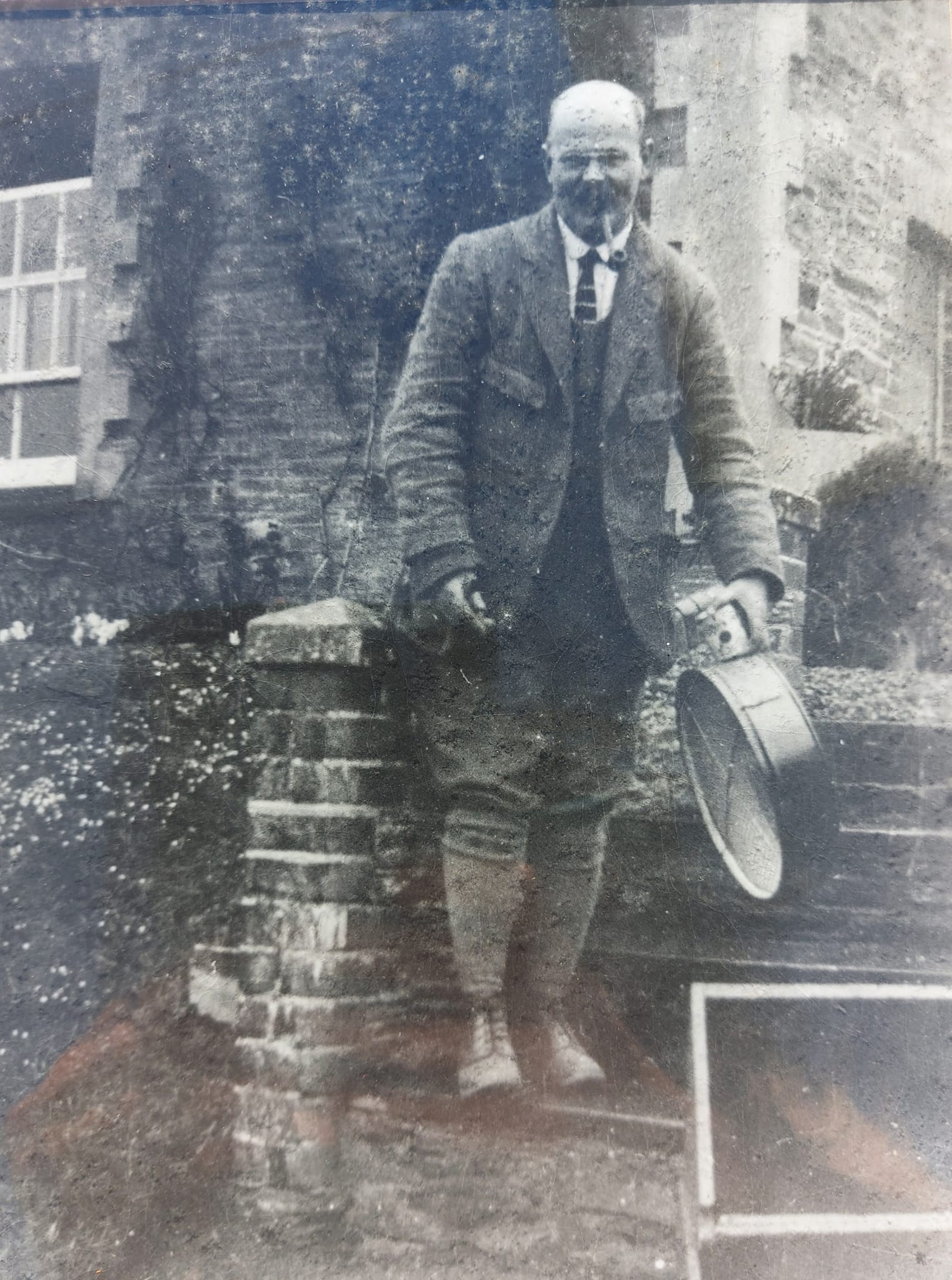
Gerald Curgenven

== Description ==
Dating from the time of the Domesday Book (1086), the hamlet of Trevalga lies 500 metres (1,600 ft) from the coast on the seaward side of the road from Boscastle to Tintagel. Trevalga is mentioned in the song Black and Gold along with other places nearby.

Unusually, much of the hamlet (The Manor of Trevalga) was, from 1961 to 2023, part of an estate held by The Gerald Curgenven Will Trust with profits after maintenance going to Marlborough College, a public school in Wiltshire.

The intent of this trust was ensure Trevalga’s preservation from development, and to have the Manor managed as much as possible in the way Curgenven had during his lifetime. People with families in the local area were prioritised, and children were allowed to assume the tenancies of their parents. Thus, many of the tenants have lived in the hamlet for generations, and Trevalga has preserved its character in a way many parts of Cornwall have not. Uncommonly for the area, Trevalga remains free of holiday homes.

There were formerly a slate quarry and a silver lead mine in the parish.

Trevalga lies within the Cornwall Area of Outstanding Natural Beauty (AONB).

== History ==
Trevalga was one of the manors held by King William at the time of the Domesday Book (1086); it had formerly been held by Queen Matilda and before her by Britric. There were 2 ploughs but land for 8 ploughs; 14 households (including serfs, villeins and smallholders), the livestock was mainly sheep and the pasture was 1 league long and half a league wide. The annual value was £4.

The recorded history of the manor continues in the 13th century when it was held by the family of Bassett; in 1601 the Bassetts sold it to the family of Welsh, who were succeeded by the family of Northcote.

In 1682, it was bought by William Bolitho of Exeter; upon the death of Richard Bolitho Stephens in 1928 it was inherited by his widow. Mrs. Stephens donated to the church a fine pulpit, reading desk and sanctuary chair, in memory of her late husband.

On 29 September 1934, Mr Gerald Curgenven purchased the whole of the Manor, including the adjacent hamlet, for the sum of £14,000 (equivalent to £866,302 in 2025). During the course of his lifetime, he expanded the estate with the addition of five further properties in the vicinity. Upon his death in 1959, at his bequest the estate was placed in a trust to preserve The Manor of Trevalga, with post maintenance profits from rent benefitting his old school, Marlborough College.

In October 2023, it was reported that the Manor had been sold for £16 million to Castle Lane Securities, a subsidiary of the British property company William Pears Group.

== Notable buildings ==
The parish church is dedicated to St Petroc; the patrons of the rectory are the dean and chapter of Truro. The earliest recorded rectors are Richard (1173) and Robert Bardolph (1191). The church was built in the 12th and 13th centuries (the tower being later than the nave and chancel). After restoration work the church was reopened in 1875. For many years it has been a member of the Boscastle Group of Anglican parishes.

The original manor house of Trevalga is Redevallen in the adjoining parish of Minster. The current building dates from 1642 but is possibly on the site of an earlier building. Writing in 1879, Sir John Maclean describes the principal room being decorated with a moulded cornice, and that it formerly had a fine moulded ceiling. MacLean also records that the walls were pierced for musketry. The house is a grade II listed building.

There is an early Cornish wheel-headed wayside cross in the churchyard. The cross is believed to date from the 8th century. It used to stand by the churchpath but was moved to the churchyard in the early 19th century by the then rector.

At the southeastern corner of the parish of Trevalga is Trevalga Mill, a ruined eighteenth century water mill. The mill lies in fields next to the Trevillet River and is the only one of the four mills on the river (the others are Halgabron, Trevillet and Trethevy) to lie upstream of the waterfall currently known as St Nectan's Kieve. The mill belonged to the nearby manor of Redevallen and would have been used first for grinding corn then perhaps also the making of worsted.

The hamlet also contains two medieval long houses.

== The Battle for Trevalga ==
In Gerald Curgenven's will (died 1959) he established a charitable trust which protects Trevalga, instructing that the village be managed as it was during his lifetime, while providing yearly donations to his old school Marlborough College.

It is understood locally that the school initially tried to claim Trevalga directly, but this failed and the trust was officially formed in 1961. In 2010, Marlborough College were given faulty legal advice that the Will Trust was failed as it breached the rule against perpetuities. As the only remaining beneficiary, the College took ownership of the Manor and placed it on the market, stating holding the Manor would be in breach of charity rules. This situation caused concern amongst the residents about the hamlet's future. Thereafter, protests and petitions were set up, using the social networking website Facebook in an attempt to prevent the sale which received national attention.

The legality of the sale was disputed by the residents of the estate who secured the opinion of Edward "Ted" Nugee QC, on an informal and fee free basis. He found the trust to be a sound, charitable trust which can exist in perpetuity. Thus, the sale was suspended, and the Manor placed back into the hands of the Trustees. The Gerald Curgenven Will Trust was registered with the Charity Commission two years later, in 2012.

In 2019, it was discovered that the Gerald Curgenven Will Trust did not have the charitable objective of preserving the Manor of Trevalga as Curgenven intended. In 2020, residents secured a further legal opinion which established that preservation of the Manor was part of the charitable purposes of the trust, and therefore not to be sold.

On 23 June 2022, in the midst of Cornwall's ongoing housing crisis, the trustees of the Gerald Curgenven Will Trust wrote to tenants to inform them they are selling Trevalga. The Manor of Trevalga was then placed on the market shortly thereafter, promoted with emphasis on the short hold tenancies and possibilities for leisure, amenities, redevelopment and setting up a shoot. The first viewing occurred on 11 August 2022.

The most recent battle for Trevalga is ongoing with the villagers protesting the sale, which contravenes Gerald Curgenven’s original intent to preserve the historic village and landscape, and to continue to provide affordable housing for local families. They have received national attention in ITV and BBC Spotlight, Daily Mirror, and The Daily Telegraph.

However, the trustees sold the estate, as reported on 8 October 2023.
