= St Juliot =

Village and civil parish in Cornwall, England

Coordinates: 50.707°N 4.642°W

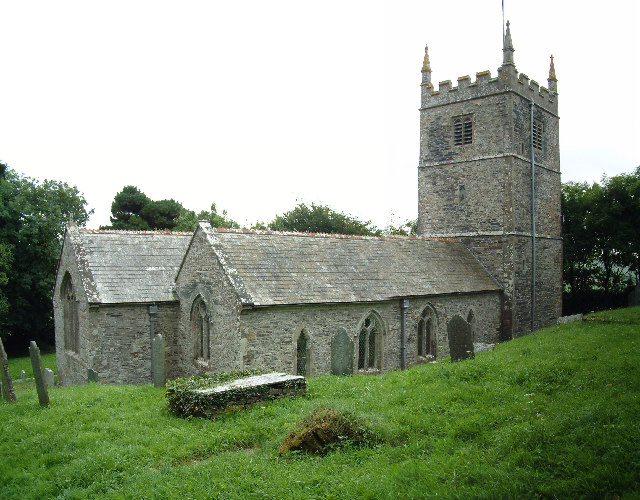
St Julitta's Church, St Juliot

St Juliot is a civil parish in north-east Cornwall, England, United Kingdom. The parish is entirely rural and the settlements within it are the hamlets of Beeny and Tresparrett. - plus a part of the adjacent village of Marshgate. The parish population at the 2011 census was 328.

== History ==
The manor of St Juliot was recorded in the Domesday Book (1086) when it was held by Thurstan from Robert, Count of Mortain. There was 1 virgate of land and land for 3 ploughs. There were half a plough, 2 serfs, 2 villeins, 30 acres of pasture and 2 cows. The value of the manor was 5 shillings though it had formerly been worth 7 shillings.

== Parish Church ==
St Julitta's church is dedicated to St Julitta (Juliot) and stands in an isolated location above the valley of the River Valency at grid reference SX 129 912 The parish church of Lanteglos by Camelford and the castle chapel at Tintagel are also dedicated to St Julitta. The chapel of St Julitta was acquired in 1238 by the canons of St Stephens by Launceston and before 1269 was annexed to their church of St Gennys. At the Reformation it was separated from St Gennys and became a donative served by perpetual curates who were paid £7 annually. It became a rectory in 1865. There was formerly a north transept which was removed in the Victorian restoration. The tower is of three stages; the south aisle is built of granite and has one additional bay east of the end of the nave. Features of interest include the vaulted granite south porch and a relief in bronze of the Deposition of Christ which is the work of an Italian 16th century Mannerist. There are two Cornish crosses in the churchyard. The parish now belongs to the Boscastle group of Anglican parishes. St Julitta's feast is celebrated on the last Sunday in June or the first Sunday in July.

== Thomas Hardy ==
In 1870 the famous British novelist, short story writer, and poet Thomas Hardy was sent to plan a church restoration at St Juliot. There he met Emma Gifford, sister-in-law of the vicar of St Juliot. She encouraged him in his writing, and they were married in 1874. After Emma Hardy died in November 1912 and was buried in Stinsford churchyard, Thomas was stricken with guilt and remorse, but the result was some of his best poetry, expressing his feelings for his wife of 38 years.

From Satires of Circumstance, Thomas Hardy's 1914 book of poems about Emma.

I found her out there
On a slope few see,
That falls westwardly
To the salt-edged air,
Where the ocean breaks
On the purple strand,
And the hurricane shakes
The solid land.

== Cornish wrestling ==
Cornish wrestling tournaments, for prizes, were held in St Juliot in the 1800s.

== Notable residents ==
- Henry Chidley Reynolds (1849–1925), a New Zealand farm manager, butter manufacturer and exporter, was born at Beeny.
