= Poundstock (electoral division) =

Electoral division of Cornwall in the UK

- ward Cornwall Council
- Boundary of Poundstock in Cornwall from 2021.
- County: Cornwall

Current ward
- Created: 2021
- Councillor: Nicky Chopak (Liberal Democrat)
- Number of councillors: One
- Created from: Poundstock

2013–2021
- Number of councillors: One
- Replaced by: Poundstock
- Created from: Poundstock

2009–2013
- Number of councillors: One
- Replaced by: Poundstock
- Created from: Council created

Poundstock (Cornish: Korlan) is an electoral division of Cornwall in the United Kingdom and returns one member to sit on Cornwall Council. The current Councillor is Nicky Chopak, a Liberal Democrat.

== Councillors ==
=== 2009-2021 ===
Election	Member	Party
2009	Phil Tucker	Conservative
2013	Nicky Chopak	Liberal Democrats
2017	Nicky Chopak	Liberal Democrats
2021	Seat abolished	

=== 2021-present ===
Election	Member	Party
2021	Nicky Chopak	Liberal Democrats

== Extent ==
2013-2021 division boundaries shown within Cornwall

=== 2009-2021 ===
Poundstock represented the villages of Crackington Haven, Widemouth Bay, Marhamchurch, Week St Mary, Jacobstow, Whitstone and North Tamerton, and the hamlets of Pencuke, Rosecare, St Gennys, Coxford, Wainhouse Corner, Trewint, Tregole, Treskinnick Cross, Poundstock, Box's Shop, Titson and Broad Langdon. The hamlets of Canworthy Water and Tresparrett Posts were shared with the Tintagel division. The division was affected by boundary changes at the 2013 election. From 2009 to 2013, the division covered 12,419 hectares; from 2013 to its abolition in 2021, the division covered 13,516 hectares.

=== 2021-present ===
The current division, created from the 2021 boundary changes (when the Council went from 123 seats to 87), represents the villages of Crackington Haven, Widemouth Bay, Marhamchurch, Week St Mary, Jacobstow, Whitstone, North Tamerton and Grimscott, and the hamlets of St Gennys, Pencuke, Rosecare, Coxford, Wainhouse Corner, Trewint, Tregole, Treskinnick Cross, Poundstock, Box's Shop, Titson, Broad Langdon, Red Post and Hersham. The hamlet of Tresparrett Posts is shared with the Camelford and Boscastle division and the division also covers a small part of the edge of the town of Stratton.

== Election results ==
=== 2021 election ===
2021 election: Poundstock
Party	Candidate	Votes	%	±%
Liberal Democrats	Nicky Chopak	945	45.0	
Conservative	Aaron Lynch	592	28.2	
Independent	Bill Harper	392	18.6	
Green	Anthony Manfredi	160	7.6	
Majority		353	16.8	
Rejected ballots		13	0.6	
Turnout		2102	47.0	
Registered electors		4469		
Liberal Democrats win (new seat)				

=== 2017 election ===
2017 election: Poundstock
Party	Candidate	Votes	%	±%
Liberal Democrats	Nicky Chopak	999	59.5	
Conservative	Alex Dart	664	39.5	
Majority		335	19.9	
Rejected ballots		17	1.0	
Turnout		1680	45.9	
Liberal Democrats hold		Swing		

=== 2013 election ===
2013 election: Poundstock
Party	Candidate	Votes	%	±%
Liberal Democrats	Nicky Chopak	487	36.7	
Conservative	Andrew Ades	449	33.8	
Mebyon Kernow	Paul Sousek	206	15.5	
Independent	Rupert Powell	171	12.9	
Majority		38	2.9	
Rejected ballots		14	1.1	
Turnout		1327	36.3	
Liberal Democrats gain from Conservative		Swing		

=== 2009 election ===
2009 election: Poundstock
Party	Candidate	Votes	%	±%
Conservative	Phil Tucker	668	40.5	
Liberal Democrats	Bob Booker	623	37.8	
UKIP	Rupert Powell	184	11.2	
Mebyon Kernow	Paul Sousek	88	5.3	
Independent	Barry Jordan	82	5.0	
Majority		45	2.7	
Rejected ballots		5	0.3	
Turnout		1650	53.4	
Conservative win (new seat)				
