= Promontory forts of Cornwall =

Cliff castles in north-west Europe

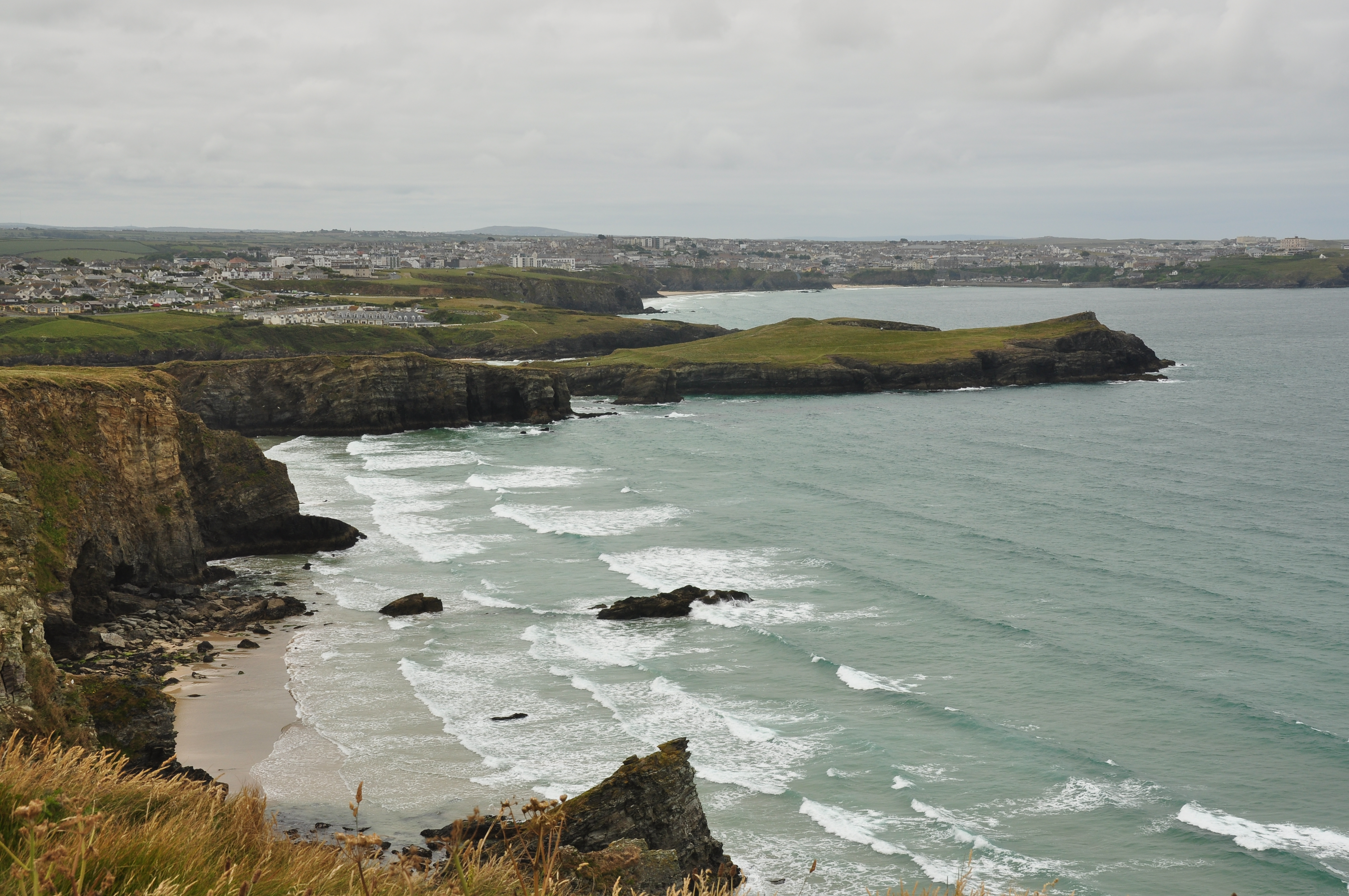
Trevelgue Head is a fortified promontory near Newquay.

Cornish promontory forts, commonly known in Cornwall as cliff castles, are coastal equivalents of the hill forts and Cornish "rounds" found on Cornish hilltops and slopes. Similar coastal forts are found on the north–west European seaboard, in Normandy, Brittany and around the coastlines of the British Isles, especially in Wales, Scotland and Ireland. Many are known in southwest England, particularly in Cornwall and its neighbouring county, Devon. Two have been identified immediately west of Cornwall, in the Isles of Scilly.

A promontory fort is a coastal headland, isolated from the mainland by one stone, turf or earthen rampart (a univallate fort), or more than one (a multivallate fort). Some promontory forts also have ditches, created by the excavation of material to form the rampart. British promontory forts were constructed during the Iron Age, and remained in more-or-less continuous use into the early Roman period. Their function remains uncertain. They would have offered ready access to sea-routes but those built in particularly inhospitable settings may have had only occasional or seasonal use. Inland hillforts show signs of human habitation and other uses before and after the Roman era, but cliff castles were occupied sparsely, if at all. Some hill forts abandoned during or before the Roman era were reoccupied from the post-Roman to early medieval eras but in the same period cliff castles fell into disuse. Some were quarried for their building stone.

Treryn Dinas is one of the few Cornish promontory forts to have been systematically excavated. Archaeologists believe it might have been developed from a Bronze Age site of ceremonial, religious or social significance to the surrounding community. Possible ancient contexts and uses of Cornish cliff castles have been a subject for study and speculation by antiquarians such as William Borlase. Modern sources agree that cliff castles may have served principally as prestigious sites for religious ceremonies, trade and administration, and that their defensive capacity may have been a secondary function.

The following cliff castles in Cornwall are listed by geographical location from the border with Devon at the Marsland Valley, west to Land's End and east via The Lizard to Cremyll overlooking Plymouth Sound. Unproven or uncertain sites are in italics.

Promontory forts (not proven or uncertain in italics)

== Dizzard ==
The Dizzard (grid reference SX 167989) is an area of slumping cliff in the parish of St Gennys. The site is within the Boscastle to Widemouth SSSI and is known for its lichen communities which are of international importance. The promontory fort identified by the West Cornwall Field Club is probably a natural feature.

== Castle Point ==
Castle Point (grid reference SX144978) is claimed as a possible site by the West Cornwall Field Club. English Heritage describes it as a probably natural feature.

== Willapark (Boscastle) ==
Willapark (Boscastle) (grid reference SX090913) is a headland to the west of Boscastle with a former coastguard lookout on the summit. It has a single 110 m straight bank, indistinct to the south-west and up to 1.8 m high, with a ditch on the landward side at its north-eastern end. The present path onto the headland may indicate the original entrance. The fort overlooks Forrabury Common, a medieval field system.

== Dinas Head ==
Dinas Head (grid reference SW848762) is on the western side of Trevose Head within the parish of St Merryn. The headland is a Scheduled Ancient Monument and is included in a list of cliff castles awaiting classification. Aerial photographs show no sign of earthworks on the neck of the headland.

== Winecove Point ==
Winecove Point (grid reference SW854738) is to the south of Treyarnon Bay, within the parish of St Merryn. It comprises three headlands, situated between White Cove and Wine Cove, each of which is registered as a separate Ancient Monument. The South West Coast Path passes on the east side of the entrance(s).

== Trevelgue Head ==
Trevelgue Head (grid reference SW825630) is a scheduled monument a short distance north-east of Newquay. The defensive ramparts of the fort, and two round barrows dating from the early Bronze Age, can be seen. With seven ramparts, Trevelgue is among the most defended prehistoric sites in Cornwall. An archaeological excavation of the site in 1939 by C. K. Croft Andrew was discontinued on the outbreak of war, and the findings were not published until many years later. There are foundations of Iron Age roundhouses, of the 2nd century BC. There is evidence of bronze and iron smelting, and many items of worked stone, shards of decorated pottery, and objects of tin, copper and iron were found.

== Tregea Hill ==
Tregea Hill (grid reference SW648454) (also known as Western Hill) is the site of a possible promontory fort on the headland overlooking the village and former port of Portreath. Tregea was recorded in 1205 as Trege possibly meaning ″homestead of the bank or hedge″. The headland is enclosed by an earthen bank approximately 0.75 m high, and 1.5 m wide at the base, partly eroded by the sea.

== Crane Castle ==
Crane Castle (grid reference SW631440) is on Carvannel Downs in the parish of Illogan. It is named or described in records in 1530, and again in 1635. The antiquarian William Borlase visited and described the site in the mid–18th century. Much of the cliff has eroded but a double rampart and ditches survive, being 85 m (278.9 ft) and 71 m (232.9 ft) in length. The ramparts average 2.3 m (7.5 ft) in height and the ditch is up to 2 m (6.6 ft) deep and 1.5 m (4.9 ft) wide. Small scale excavations in 2012 revealed the base of the inner ditch, 5.5 m (18.0 ft) below the (contemporary) top of the rampart. The outer ditch was cut 1.5 m (4.9 ft) into the bedrock. Ditch fill of quartz suggested an attempt to impress observers from the landward side. The narrow area between the ditches and steepness of the bands was thought to suggest a ″killing zone″, where attackers who overran the outer rampart, could be entrapped. The only find was the rim of a finely made bottle from the Roman period, probably imported from Gaul.

== Gurnard's Head ==
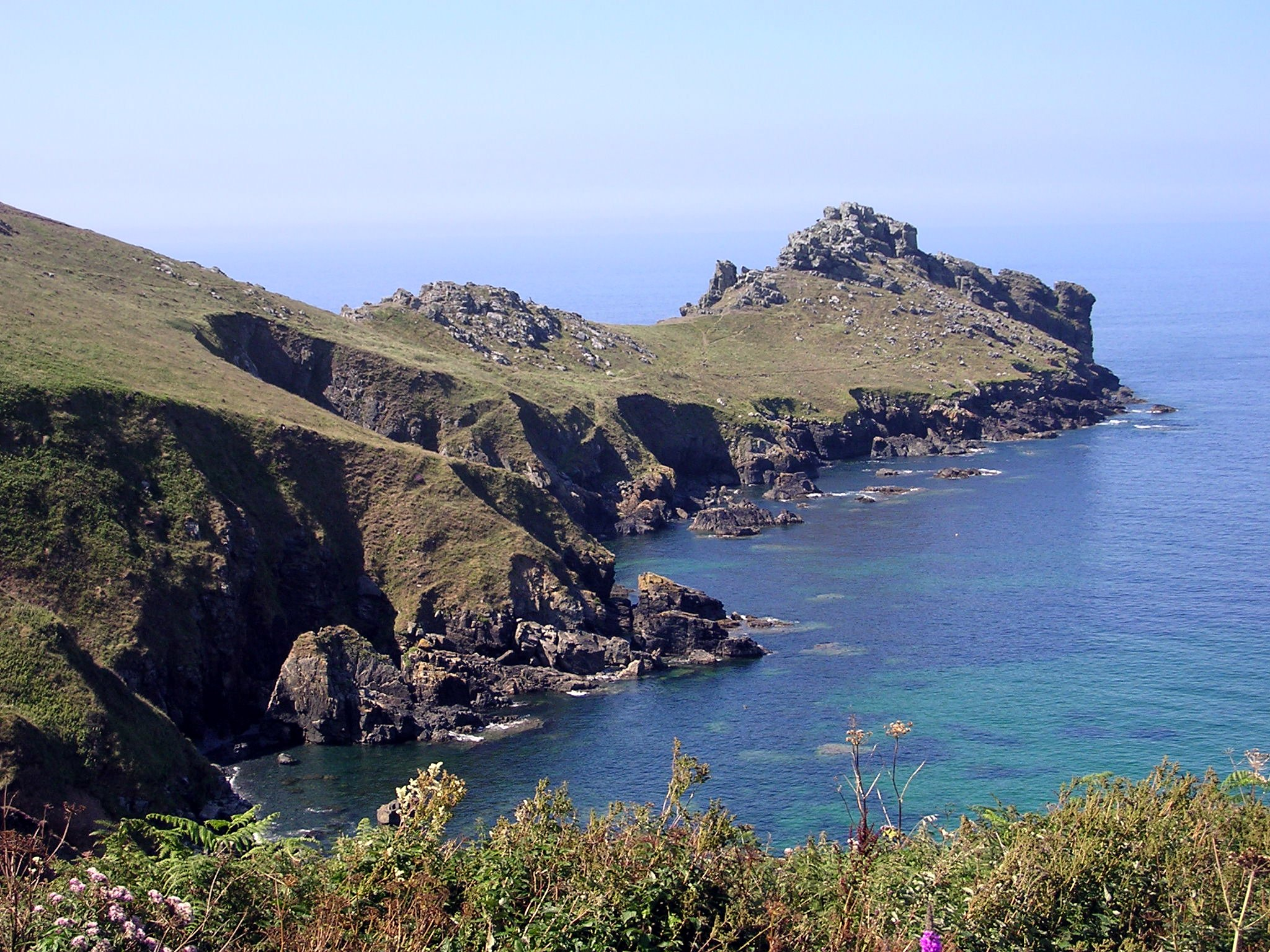
Gurnard's Head cliff castle

Gurnard's Head (Cornish: Ynyal, meaning desolate one) (grid reference SW431388) is a multivallate hillfort in the parish of Zennor and is one of only three to be excavated in Cornwall – the others being Maen Castle and Trevelgue Head. The inner rampart is the largest being over 5 m wide at the base and up to 2 m high although it was probably much higher as there is fallen masonry nearby. On the landward side there is an earthen bank with ditches on each side. Sixteen huts on the eastern side, sheltered from the prevailing wind show up as shallow scoops. Three were excavated (one partially) with few finds. Exact dating was not possible but the finds of an iron knife and iron buckle, spindle whorls, rubbing stone and pottery sherds indicate the middle second century BC for the initial occupation. The site is owned by the National Trust and is within the Aire Point to Carrick Du Site of Special Scientific Interest.

== Bosigran ==
Bosigran Castle (grid reference SW415371) is an Ancient Monument within the parish of Zennor and owned by the National Trust. The cliff castle at Gurnard's Head is within sight to the east. The headland is cut off by a stone wall up to 1.6 m high with a blocked central entrance. There is no external ditch and no evidence of hut circles or occupation.

Henry Jenner suggested Bosigran may mean 'the Dwelling of Igerna', the mother of King Arthur in Arthurian legend. Jenner also noted its proximity to Bosworlas (in St Just parish) 'the Dwelling of Gorlois', Igraine's husband in the Historia Regum Britanniae, who he believed was a real petty-chief in fifth or sixth century Dumnonia.

== Kenidjack ==
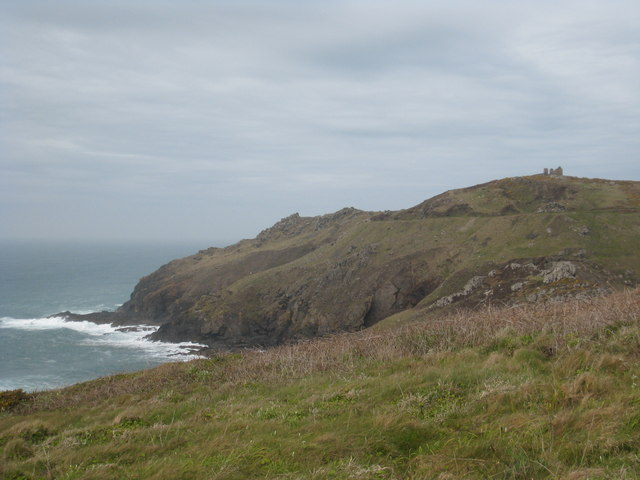
Kenidjack Castle

Kenidjack Castle (grid reference SW355327) is a multivallate hillfort in the parish of St Just. Two sets of triple ramparts with outer ditches have been built on the north east and south west sides. The northern ramparts are the best preserved and show the remains of stone revetting, with the inner one almost wholly built of stone. The outermost rampart of the southern set has been lost through erosion and landslip. Shallow hollows and scoops within the headland may be signs of hut circles or mining activity.

== Cape Cornwall ==
William Borlase, in the 1870s, recorded the traces of a bank and ditch of what he identified as a likely cliff castle on Cape Cornwall (grid reference SW349319). A survey in 1960 identified only a possible ridge within the field, at the narrowest point on the neck adjoining the headland. English Heritage conclude that this was probably not the site of a fort or cliff castle.

== Maen Castle ==
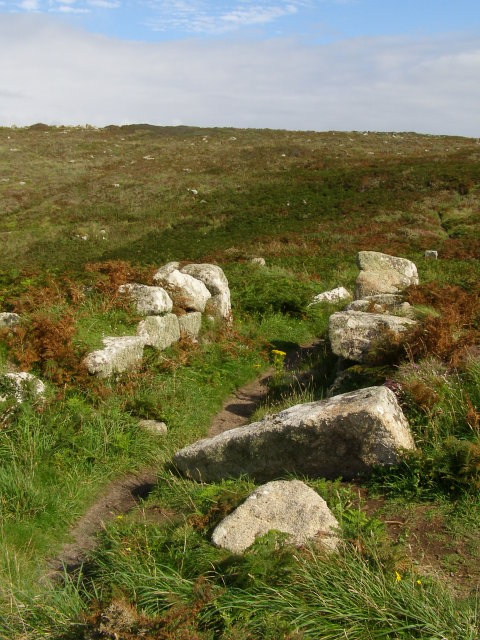
Entrance to Maen Castle

Maen Castle (Cornish: Maen, Men or Mayon, stone castle) (grid reference SW348257) is an Ancient Monument owned by the National Trust, and is situated between Sennen Cove and Land's End, within the parish of Sennen. The South West Coast Path passes the entrance. A ditch and external bank cuts off a small headland. It is thought to be one of the earliest cliff castles.

The West Cornwall Field Club excavated the site in 1939 and again in 1948–9. Three hundred pottery sherds, mainly from one habitation site, were dated to between 800 and 400 BC. A 1986 National Trust survey found a ″kink″ in the line of the wall, which showed that the wall was built into an earlier field system, thought to be Bronze Age or early Iron Age.

== Carn Les Boel ==
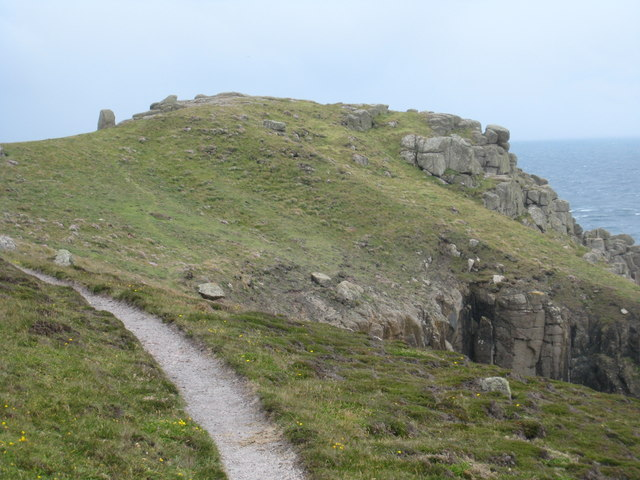
Carn Les Boel

Carn Les Boel (grid reference SW357232) is an Ancient Monument situated between Nanjizal and Gwennap Head in the parish of St Levan. The South West Coast Path passes nearby. Its identification as a cliff castle or promontory fort is insecure. One of its banks may date to the enclosure of Higher Bosistow Cliff in the 19th century; apart from a gap of 5 m at Zawn Peggy, where the cliff has eroded, the bank and ditch follow the line of the cliff northwards for a further 300 m.

== Treryn Dinas ==
Treryn Dinas is a promontory fort and scheduled monument near Treen, on the Penwith peninsula. It is owned by the National Trust. Its landward side has widely spaced defensive earthworks; the innermost rampart, which crosses the narrowest part of the peninsula neck, is up to 2 metres (6.6 ft) high. Beyond it are two low curving ramparts, and a massive outer rampart, up to 6.1 metres (20 ft) high, with a ditch on its northern side and a causewayed entrance. The Logan Rock sits seawards within the fort, above the cliffs.

== St Michael's Mount ==
A complex of earthworks on St Michael's Mount (grid reference SW514298) are considered to be the ramparts of a cliff castle. They were discovered in 1992 on the eastern side of the Mount and separate the granite outcrop from the harbour area.

== Lankidden ==
Lankidden (grid reference SW755168) is a univallate cliff castle between Coverack and Kennack Sands on the Lizard peninsula. The rampart is 100 m long and up to 4 m high and the ditch is 0.5 m deep. To the west, part of the rampart and ditch have been lost to erosion.

== Rame Head ==
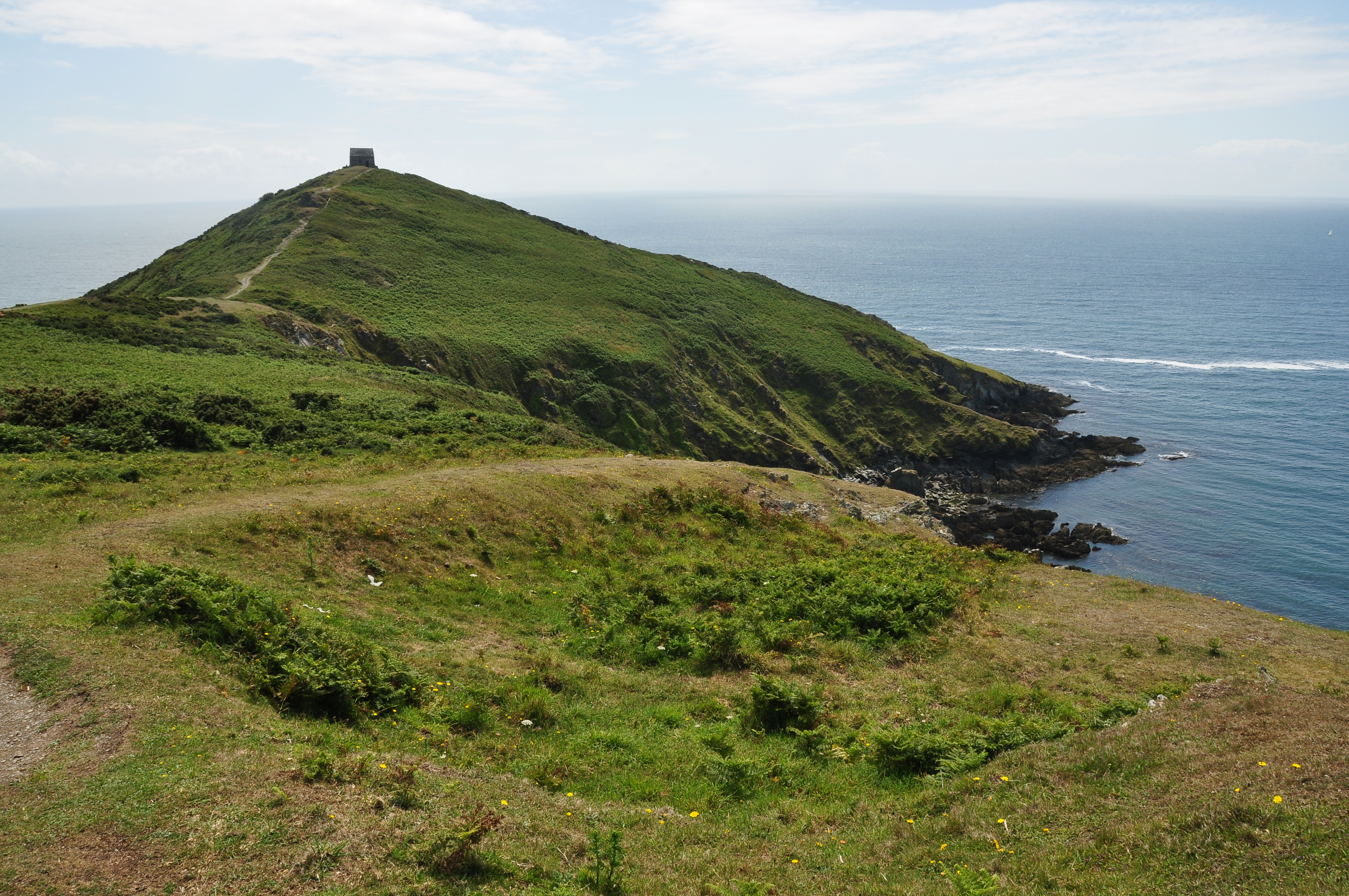
Rame Head

Rame Head (grid reference SX41794828) is a promontory fort defined by steep cliffs on three sides and at the northeast, a narrow neck of land connects it to the mainland. Here it is protected by a deep outer ditch with an earth and stone rampart and a central entrance. The rampart has been built over by 20th century concrete defensive structures, now demolished. Some flints have been found inside. At the top of rising ground at the centre of the fort is a small medieval chapel.

== See also ==
- Logan Rock at Treryn Dinas promontory fort, close to Treen (St Levan)
- Promontory fort
- Map of Promontory forts of Cornwall compiled from this page
