= Nimble =

Nimble may refer to:

- HMS Nimble, the name of several Royal Navy vessels
- RMAS Nimble (A222), a British naval auxiliary ship
- USS Nimble, the name of two US Navy vessels
- Castle Nimble, a castle in Wales
- Camp Nimble, a US Army post in South Korea
- Nimble Storage, an enterprise data storage company
- Nimble, a British brand of bread produced by Hovis
- Nimble (now known as Curtsy), a mobile app for renting dresses

== See also ==
- Nymble (disambiguation)
