= Wainhouse =

Wainhouse is a surname. Notable people with the surname include:

- Austryn Wainhouse (1927–2014), American translator
- Dave Wainhouse (born 1967), Canadian baseball player

== See also ==
- Wainhouse Tower, folly in Halifax, West Yorkshire, England
- Wainhouse Corner, hamlet in Cornwall, England
