= Boscastle to Widemouth =

Coastal Site of Special Scientific Interest in Cornwall, England

- Site of Special Scientific Interest
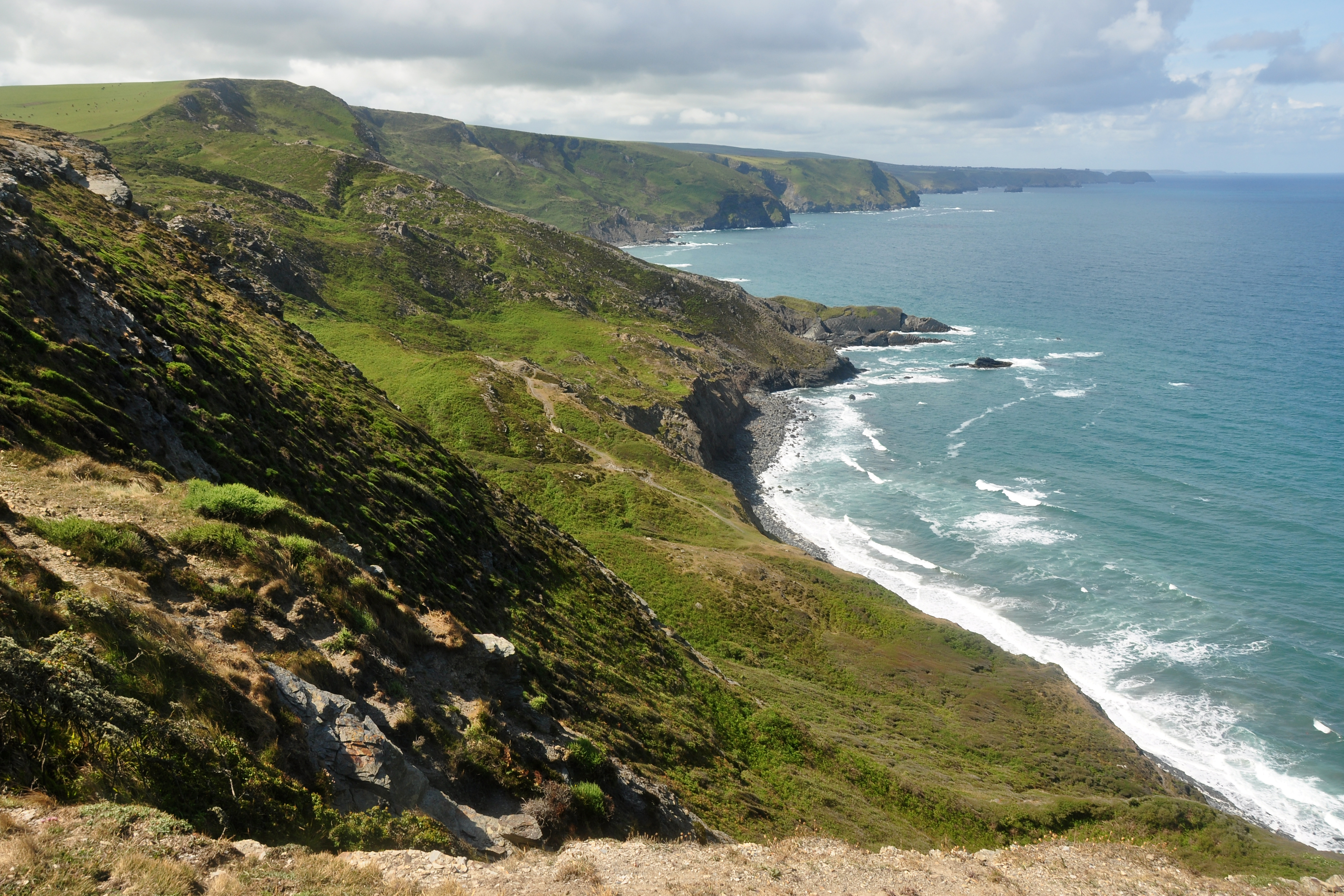
- High Cliff, showing the characteristic slumping creating an undercliff

- Location within Cornwall
- Location of Boscastle to Widemouth.
- Area of search: Cornwall
- Grid reference: SX165993
- Coordinates: 50.7646°N 4.6027°W
- Interest: Biological/Geological
- Area: 639 hectares (6.390 km^{2}; 2.467 sq mi)
- Notification date: 1972

Boscastle to Widemouth is a coastal Site of Special Scientific Interest (SSSI) in Cornwall, England, noted for its biological and geological characteristics. The Dizzard dwarf oak woodland is unique and of international importance for its lichen communities, with 131 species recorded.

== Geography ==
The 639-hectare (1,580-acre) site is located on the north Cornish coast, by the Celtic Sea of the Atlantic Ocean. The 12 miles (19 km) length of coastline stretches from Boscastle in the south to Widemouth Bay to the north. The coast on either side of Crackington Haven is characterised by the cliffs collapsing and rather than having steep vertical slopes such as in west Cornwall, there is a series of 'undercliffs' which are thickly vegetated. Some are grazed by cattle and horses and the resulting mosaic of semi–natural habitats is of national importance for the coastal heath and grassland. High Cliff (grid reference SX125943) at 223 metres (732 ft) is the highest cliff in Cornwall.

The South West Coast Path runs through the SSSI, parts of the coast are owned and managed by the National Trust and five Geological Conservation Review sites are within the area.

== Geology ==
The coast between Boscastle and Widemouth is characterised by high slumped cliffs leading to areas of thickly vegetated, sloping lower undercliffs. The underlying rock, a type of shale which is easily fractured, is known to geologists as the Crackington formation and the layered strata contorted by earth movements can best be seen at Crackington Haven and Millook. The rocks date to the Namurian stage roughly 326 to 313 Ma (million years ago) and were folded during the Variscan orogeny a period of mountain building caused by the collision of two continents.

During the Quaternary Period the area was covered in periglacial deposits called head. At the time the area was tundra and was just to the south of an ice sheet which covered most of Britain.

There are five Geological Conservation Review sites within the SSSI. They are:-

- Boscastle
- Millook to Foxhole Point
- Rusey Cliff to Buckator
- Widemouth to Crackington
- Widemouth to Saltstone Strand

== Wildlife and ecology ==
The valleys at Crackington Haven, Cleave, Dizzard and Millook show good examples of the zonation of habitats from splash zone lichen communities, to cliff vegetation with maritime grass, heath and scrub into woodland communities.

Sea cliff vegetation

In the splash zone at and above the high water mark there are black, orange and grey coloured lichen zones. Verrucaria species such as V. maura are black; Xanthoria parietina and Caloplaca marina are bright yellow and orange; Lecanora atra is grey; and Ramalina siliquosa is green. Rock samphire (Crithmum maritimum) is found on rock ledges and crevices, 6–10 m above the high water mark along with sea spleenwort (Asplenium marinum), common scurvy-grass (Cochlearia officinalis), buck's-horn plantain (Plantago coronopus), thrift (Armeria maritima) and rock sea-spurrey (Spergularia rupicola). Cliff breeding birds along the coast are fulmar (Fulmarus glacialis), shag (Gulosus aristotelis), kestrel (Falco tinnunculus), peregrine (Falco peregrinus), raven (Corvus corax) and rock pipit (Anthus petrosus). The chough (Pyrrhocorax pyrrhocorax), last bred on the north Cornwall coast in 1952 and is currently breeding in the Land's End and Lizard areas.

Maritime grassland

Soil accumulates where the slope is not too steep and herb rich coastal grassland communities develop. The dominant grass is red fescue and the flowering plants include bird's–foot trefoil (Lotus corniculatus), wild thyme (Thymus serpyllum), wild carrot (Daucus carota), sea campion (Silene maritima), spring squill (Scilla verna) and kidney vetch (Anthyllis vulneraria).

Maritime heath

A feature of coastal heaths is the undulating or waved appearance caused by the exposure to winds. A good example is at Aller Shoot, a valley to the north of Crackington Haven. The taller species are heather (Calluna vulgaris), bell heather (Erica cinerea) and western gorse (Ulex gallii). Growing amongst these plants are bristle bent (Agrostis curtisii), red fescue (Festuca rubra), sheep's–bit (Jasione montana), tormentil (Potentilla erecta) and lousewort (Pedicularis sylvatica).

Scrub

The dominant species of scrub depend on previous land management with varying amounts of blackthorn (Prunus spinosa), European gorse (Ulex europaeus), bramble (Rubus fruticosus), wild privet (Ligustrum vulgare) and bracken (Pteridium aquilinum). Amongst the leaf litter can be found Yorkshire fog (Holcus lanatus), honeysuckle (Lonicera periclymenum), bluebell (Hyacinthoides non-scripta) and wild madder (Rubia peregrina). Typical birds seen within the SSSI are stonechat (Saxicola rubicola), linnet (Carduelis cannabina) and whitethroat (Sylvia communis).

=== Dizzard woodland ===
The woodland is between Crackington Haven and Millook and runs for approximately 2 miles (3.2 km) between the coastal path and the shore. Of international importance for its lichen communities, the ″dwarf ″ woodland at Dizzard Point (grid reference SX165993) grows on exposed, unstable cliffs with a canopy dominated by sessile oak (Quercus petraea). Other woodland trees recorded are pedunculate oak (Q. robur), rowan (Sorbus aucuparia) and wild service-tree (S. torminalis). The maximum height of the canopy is from one to eight metres depending on exposure to the salt–laden, unpolluted winds and the trees are covered with Lobarion communities of lichens; the main species are Lobaria pulmonaria, Lobaria scrobiculata, Parmeliella atlantica, Parmeliella plumbea and Pseudocyphellaria crocata, which is known from only one other site in England and Wales. Other lichens rarities include Bombyliospora pachycarpa, Graphina ruiziana, Lecidea carollii, Melaspilea ochrothalmia and Pannaria rubiginosa. The ground flora consists of a base rich plant community with ramsons (Allium ursinum), lords and ladies (Arum maculatum) and meadowsweet (Filipendula ulmaria) in the wetter areas. Otherwise the ground flora is heath-like with ling (Calluna vulgaris) and bilberry (Vaccinium myrtillus) as the dominant species, and cow wheat (Melampyrum pratense) and hay-scented buckler-fern (Dryopteris aemula) also occurring. Management by the National Trust includes the removal of invasive sycamore (Acer pseudoplatanus) and maintenance of the coastal footpath from where the wood can be observed as there is no public access.

=== Large blue butterfly ===
The discovery of the large blue butterfly (Phengaris arion) at Millook by E A Waterhouse in 1891 was described as both unexpected and remarkable. It had been extinct in Northamptonshire for thirty years and was declining in areas such as the Cotswolds and along the south coast of Devon. It had probably been overlooked in isolated Cornwall until just before the coming of the railways to Camelford in 1893 and to Bude in 1898. The butterfly was found to inhabit valleys as far west as Tintagel and in some places found in great abundance, which led to some collectors visiting year after year and taking hundreds for collections. Not surprisingly by 1925 the species was in decline, although not solely due to collecting. In 1902 many acres of the original habitat at Millook had been enclosed and ploughed, and P M Bright noted how since 1911 "the gorse has been allowed to grow up over the whole area ... especially in the neighbourhood of Millook. This has choked out its (food plant) in many places where it was abundant, and has also driven away the ants". The temporary demise of rabbits (Oryctolagus cuniculus) caused by the rapid spread of myxomatosis after its introduction in 1953 would also have led to the spread of gorse, and in that year Millook valley was described as "by then totally overgrown and without a vestige of wild thyme, but several other localities, including parts of Crackington Haven, appeared to be, and in fact still are much less obviously changed". In 1963 a search of twenty-three sites in Cornwall found only eight small colonies left, all to the north of Bude and thus outside the area of this SSSI; the large blue was last seen in Cornwall in 1973 (although it was introduced to a north Cornwall site in 2000).
