= Dizzard =

Rural area in St Gennys, Cornwall, England

- Coastal cliff,
- Interactive map of Dizzard
- Coordinates: 50°45′N 4°37′W
- Location: Cornwall, UK

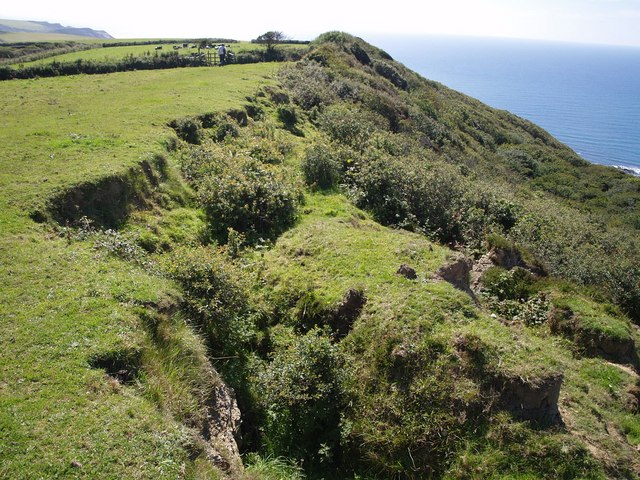
Coastal slippage at Dizzard showing the woodland

Dizzard (Cornish: Dyserth, meaning very steep) is an area, in the civil parish of St Gennys, Cornwall, containing five farms (or former farms). On the coast is Dizzard Point (grid reference SX164994), and the unique, dwarf oak, Dizzard Wood, which is of international importance for its lichen communities.

== Geography ==
Dizzard is between the Atlantic Ocean to the north, the valley and cove of Crackington Haven to the west and the Millook woods and valley to the east. There are five named farms or (former farms); Dizzard Farm, East Dizzard, Higher Dizzard, Old Dizzard and West Dizzard. Surrounding Dizzard Point are the stunted oaks of the Dizzard Woodland. There are a number of designations for the Dizzard cliffs, including part of the Widemouth to Crackington Geological Conservation Review site, within the Boscastle to Widemouth SSSI, and the Pentire Point to Widemouth, Area of Outstanding Natural Beauty (AONB) and Heritage Coast.

=== Access ===
The Atlantic Highway is two miles to the east and a minor road from Wainhouse Corner to Millook passes through the Dizzard. The minor road is also part of National Cycle Route 3. The South West Coast Path, which follows the coast of south-west England from Somerset to Dorset and passes above the wood and along the top of the cliff.

== Wildlife and ecology ==
A stunted woodland grows on a landslip from the top of the cliff (400 feet (120 m)) down to sea-level. Exposure to salt-laden winds has resulted in a tight wind-pruned canopy with trees from 1 to 8 metre high. Sessile oak (Quercus petraea) is the dominant species with pedunculate oak (Q. robur), birch (Betula spp), rowan (Sorbus aucuparia) and a few wild-service trees (Sorbus torminalis). Many of the trees are swathed in lichens and moss with 131 species of lichen recorded and there are a number of species that are largely confined to a few north Cornwall and Devon sites. One hundred and twenty flowering plants have been found including, bluebell (Hyacinthoides non-scripta), dog's mercury (Mercurialis perennis), heath pearlwort (Sagina subulata), primrose (Primula vulgaris), sanicle (Sanicula europaea), sheep's sorrel (Rumex acetosella), small bristle club rush (Isolepis setacea), wild strawberry (Fragaria vesca), wood garlic (Allium ursinum) and wood vetch (Vicia sylvatica). Damp areas are dominated by bilberry (Vaccinium myrtillus), cow-wheat (Melampyrum pratense), tufted hair-grass (Deschampsia cespitosa) and the ferns broad buckler fern (Dryopteris dilatata) and royal fern (Osmunda regalis) are abundant. The hay-scented buckler-fern (Dryopteris aemula) is of interest. There was a heronry here in the first decades of the 20th century.

=== Lichens ===
There is a rich Lobaria lichen community including tree lungwort (Lobaria pulmonaria) which grow on the oaks. A number of species are confined to north Cornwall and Devon, these include Bombyliospora pachycarpa, Graphina ruziana, Lecidea carollii, Melaspilea ochrothalamia, Pannaria rubiginosa, Parmeliellia atlantica and Parmeliellia plumbea. Other notable lichens include the blue-grey Stricta limbata and the yellow-orange Pseudocyphellaria crocata.

== Bibliography ==
- Hughes, Michel R; Tonkin, Beth (1997). The Culm Natural Area (Report). Newton Abbot: English Nature.
