= Tresparrett =

Hamlet in Cornwall, England

Coordinates: 50°41′47″N 4°37′44″W

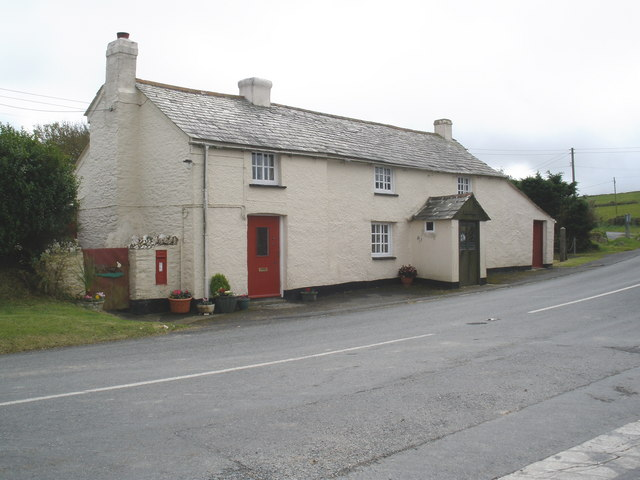
A cottage with attached post box near Tresparrett

Tresparrett is a hamlet in north Cornwall, England, United Kingdom at Grid ref SX 14 19. Tresparrett was noted in the Domesday Book (1086), under the name Rosperuet held by Jovin from Robert, Count of Mortain; there was land for six ploughs, 300 acres of pasture and six households.

== See also ==
- Tresparrett Posts
