= Pencuke =

Hamlet in Cornwall, England

Coordinates: 50.720°N 4.602°W

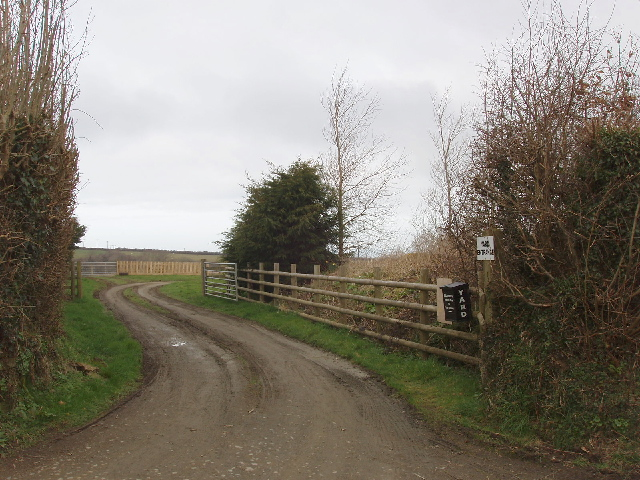
Pencuke Farm

Pencuke is a hamlet near Higher Crackington in northeast Cornwall, England, UK.
