= Laurence Braddon =

English politician and writer

Laurence Braddon (died 29 November 1724), was an English politician and writer. He believed that Arthur Capell, 1st Earl of Essex was murdered, and was found guilty of a number of crimes committed in the process of attempting to prove this.

== Biography ==
Braddon was the second son of William Braddon of Treworgy, in St Gennys, Cornwall and studied law at the Inner Temple.

He was elected a Fellow of the Royal Society in 1681.

When Arthur Capell, 1st Earl of Essex died in the Tower in 1683, Braddon believed that he had been murdered, and worked to collect sufficient evidence to prove the murder. He set on foot inquiries on the subject in London, and when a rumour reached him that the news of the earl's death was known at Marlborough on the very day of, if not before, the occurrence, he posted off. When his action became known at court, he was arrested and put under restraint. For a time he was let out on bail, but on 7 February 1683/4 he was tried with Hugh Speke at the king's bench on the accusation of conspiring to spread the belief that the Earl of Essex was murdered by some persons about him, and of endeavouring to suborn witnesses to testify the same. Braddon was found guilty on all the counts, but Speke was acquitted of the latter charge. The one was fined 1,000 pounds and the other 2,000 pounds, with sureties for good behaviour during their lives. Braddon remained in prison for five years until the landing of William III, when he was liberated.

He was called to the bar in 1693 and for some time worked at his profession. In February 1695 he was appointed solicitor to the wine licence office, a place valued at 100 pounds per annum.

He died on Sunday, 29 November 1724.

== Writings ==
Most of Braddon's works relate to the death of the Earl of Essex. The "Enquiry into and Detection of the Barbarous Murther of the late Earl of Essex" (1689) was probably by him, and he was the author of "Essex's Innocency and Honour vindicated" (1690), "Murther will out" (1692), "True and Impartial Narrative of the Murder of Arthur, Earl of Essex" (1729), as well as "Bishop Burnet's late History charg'd with great Partiality and Misrepresentation" (1725) in the bishop's account of this affair. Braddon also published "The Constitutions of the Company of Watermen and Lightermen", and an "Abstract of the Rules, Orders, and Constitutions" of the same company, both of them issued in 1708. "The Miseries of the Poor are a National Sin, Shame, and Danger" was the title of a work (1717) in which he argued for the establishment of guardians of the poor and inspectors for the encouragement of arts and manufactures. Five years later he brought out "Particular Answers to the most material Objections made to the Proposals for relieving the Poor". The report of his trial was printed in 1684, and reprinted in "Cobbett's State Trials", ix. 1127–1228, and his impeachment of Bishop Burnet's "History" is reprinted in the same volume of Cobbett, pp. 1229–1332.
