= Rhizine =

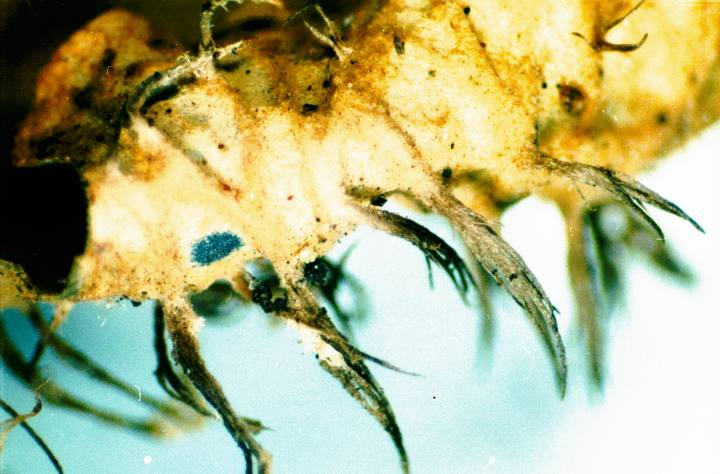
Lower cortex of Peltigera praetextata showing rhizines

In lichens, rhizines are multicellular root-like structures arising mainly from the lower surface. A lichen with rhizines is termed rhizinate, while a lichen lacking rhizines is termed erhizinate. Rhizines serve only to anchor the lichen to their substrate; they do not absorb nutrients, as plant roots do. Characteristics of the rhizines are used to identify lichens, for example, whether they are dense or sparse, uniformly distributed or clumped in specific areas, and straight or branched. Only foliose lichens may possess rhizines, not crustose or fruticose lichens, which lack a lower cortex.

Rhizohyphae are a type of attachment structure on some lichens. Rhizohyphae are more slender than rhizines and are one cell thick in diameter. Rhizohyphae often occur as a felt-like hyphal mass.

== See also ==
- Rhizoid
