= Cripp's Cove =

Cove in Cornwall, England

Coordinates: 50.041°N 5.635°W

Cripp's Cove is a cove on the coast of west Cornwall, England, UK.

The inlet is situated on the Logan Rock peninsula one mile (1.6 km) east of Porthcurno, Cornwall. The tiny island of Seghy stands a few metres off Cripp's Cove.

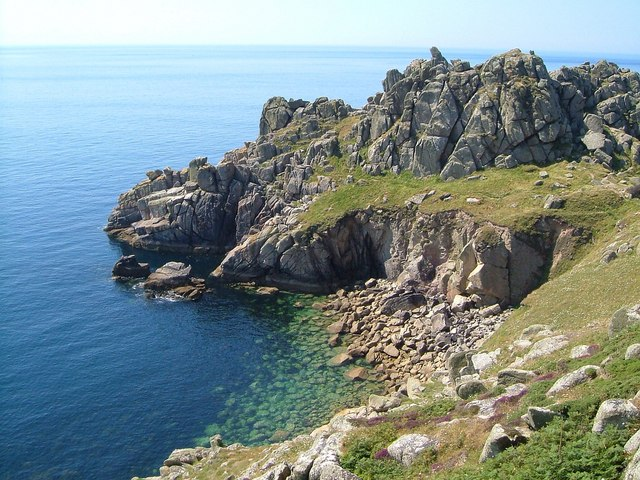
The coast at Cripp's Cove

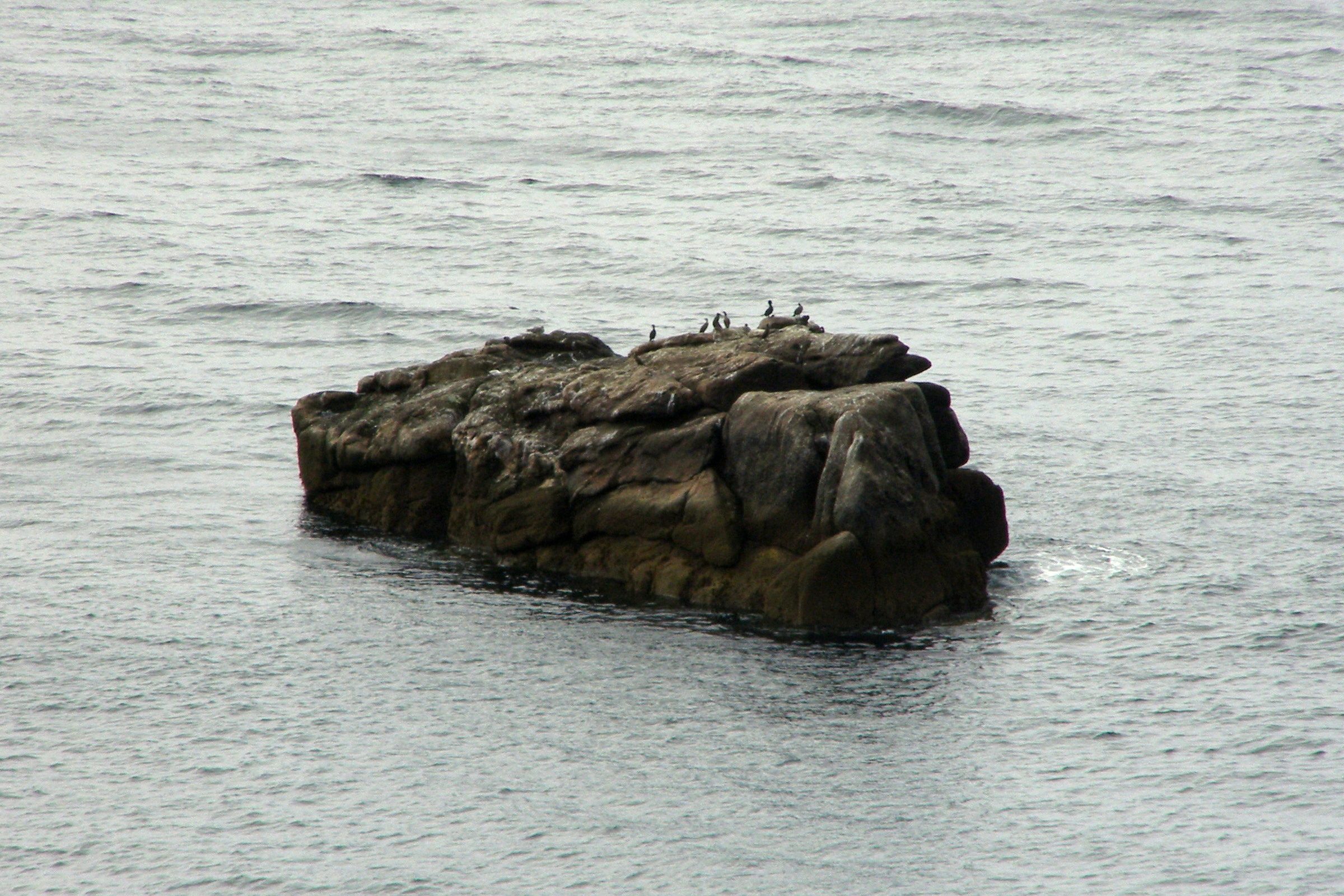
Seghy island viewed from the coast path to the north
