= Rosecare =

Hamlet in Cornwall, England

Coordinates: 50°43′55″N 4°35′48″W

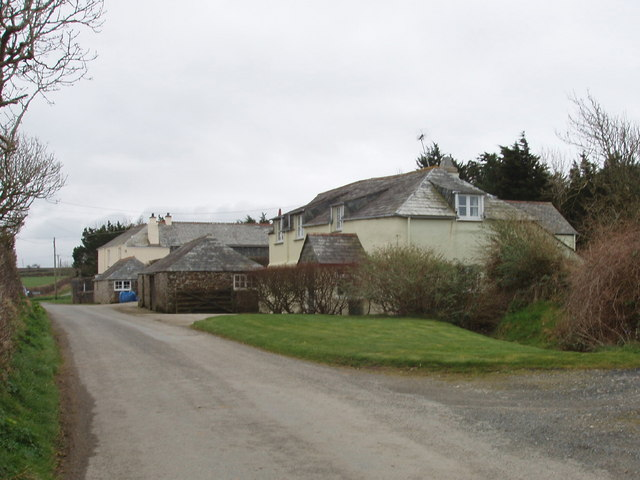
Rosecare

Rosecare is a hamlet in the parish of St Gennys, Cornwall, England. Rosecare is east of Higher Crackington.
