= Titson =

Hamlet in Cornwall, England

Coordinates: 50°47′20″N 4°29′45″W

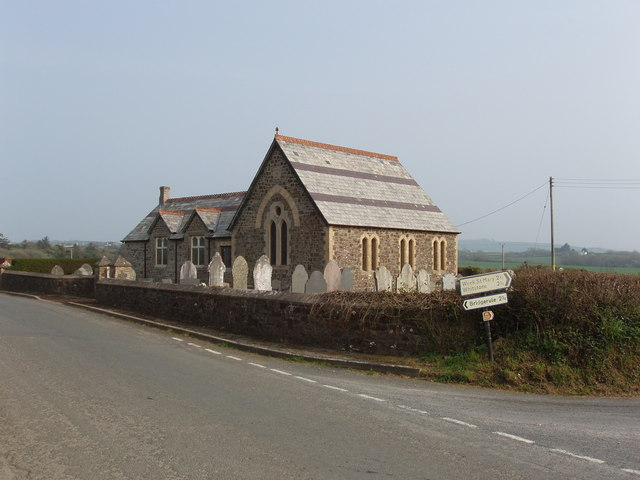
Former Methodist chapel, Titson

Titson or Budd's Titson is a hamlet in the parish of Marhamchurch, Cornwall, England, United Kingdom.
