= Nymble =

Nymble may refer to:

- Nymble (Pokémon), a Pokémon species
- Nymble, a building of the Student Union at the Royal Institute of Technology in Stockholm, Sweden

== See also ==
- Nimble (disambiguation)
