= Coxford, Cornwall =

Hamlet in Cornwall, England

Coordinates: 50.7416°N 4.6078°W

Coxford
- Location within Cornwall
- OS grid reference: SX161968
- Civil parish: St Gennys
- Unitary authority: Cornwall
- Ceremonial county: Cornwall
- Region: South West
- Country: England
- Sovereign state: United Kingdom
- Post town: Bude
- Postcode district: EX23
- Police: Devon and Cornwall
- Fire: Cornwall
- Ambulance: South Western

Coxford is a hamlet in the parish of St Gennys (where the 2011 census population was included) in north Cornwall, England.

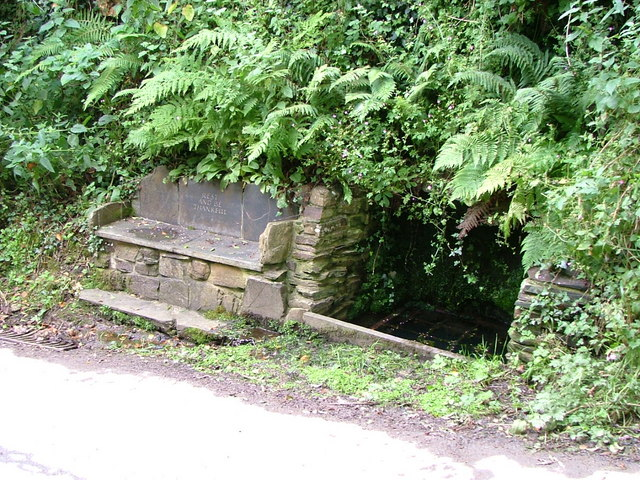
A well and seat at Coxford
