= Tresparrett Posts =

Hamlet in Cornwall, England

Coordinates: 50°42′35″N 4°37′29″W

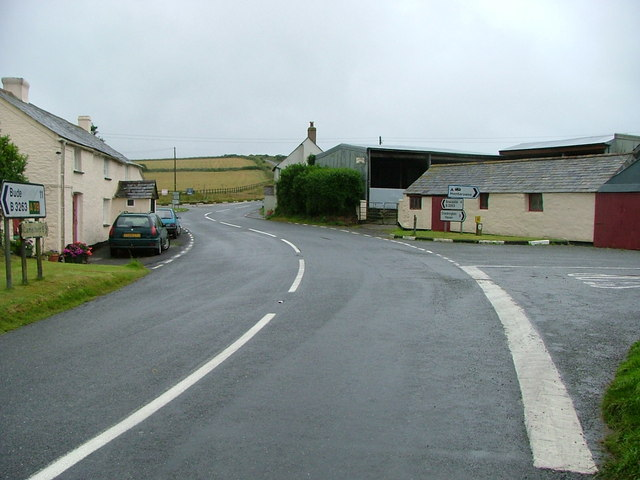
Tresparrett Posts

Tresparrett Posts is a hamlet in the civil parish of St Gennys in north Cornwall, England, United Kingdom.
