= Box's Shop =

Hamlet in Cornwall, England

Coordinates: 50.78°N 04.54°W

Box's Shop: Cornish: Shoppa Box
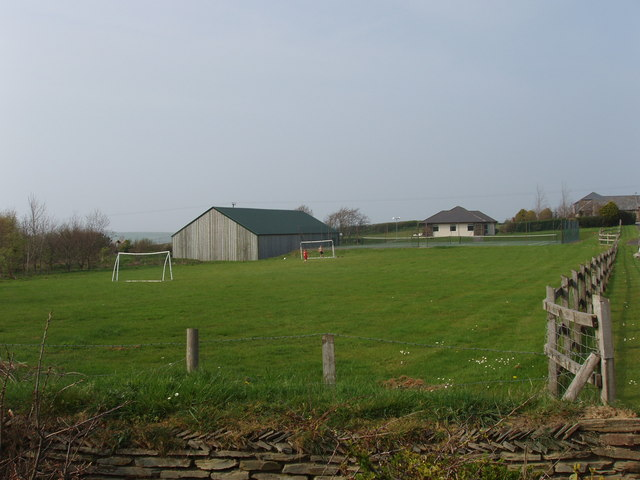
- Playing field

- Location within Cornwall
- OS grid reference: SS 215 015
- Civil parish: Poundstock
- Unitary authority: Cornwall
- Ceremonial county: Cornwall
- Region: South West
- Country: England
- Sovereign state: United Kingdom
- Post town: Bude
- Postcode district: EX23
- Dialling code: 01288
- Police: Devon and Cornwall
- Fire: Cornwall
- Ambulance: South Western
- UK Parliament: North Cornwall

Box's Shop (Cornish: Shoppa Box, meaning Box's Workshop) is a hamlet in the civil parish of Poundstock in north Cornwall, England, United Kingdom. It consists of several cottages, farms and holiday accommodation centred on a crossroads known as 'Box's Shop'. The crossroads is one mile (1.6 km) east of Widemouth Bay on the A39 'Atlantic Highway' road.
