= Curtsy (company) =

App for renting dresses

- Formerly: Nimble
- Industry: Clothing rental and resale
- Founded: 2014; 11 years ago in University, Mississippi, United States
- Founders: Sara Kiparizoska; David Oates; William Ault; Eli Allen
- Headquarters: San Francisco, California, United States
- Products: App, blog
- Number of employees: ~20
- Website: curtsyapp.com

Curtsy, previously known as Nimble, is a peer-to-peer app for renting dresses. It allows people to offer dresses for rental by location, style, color, occasion or rating. Owners and renters of the dresses coordinate an exchange location, while Curtsy manages payment and the transaction. The application includes a blog about current fashion. Curtsy was designed by Sara Kiparizoska and William Ault, both students at the University of Mississippi, where Curtsy was first launched in 2015. The founders of the company include David Oates, Curtsy's current CEO William Ault, and lead developer Eli Allen. Curtsy is located in San Francisco, CA with an office in Oxford, Mississippi.

== History ==
Curtsy began in 2014 at the University of Mississippi's research park, Insight Park. It has been funded by Rebel Venture Capital and Y Combinator. Initial capital was $120,000 in exchange for 7% equity.

== Business model ==
Dress owners decide the price of their rentals. Curtsy receives 30% of the profit for each transaction. Renters are required to also pay a $5 transaction fee to cover potential damages.

== Services ==
=== The App ===
Curtsy utilizes a free app that is downloadable onto smart phones. There are five main pages on the app including a dress feed, a messaging dashboard, a page to post dress pictures to, a rentals feed, and a profile page containing the tab of the user's own dresses and a tab of the user's favorited dresses. The app's homepage feed on reveals a "closet" with dresses in the user's area posted in a chronological fashion.

=== The Blog ===
Curtsy's blog contains a written portion and professional photos of featured subjects. The blog has subsections categorized by college campus.
