= Logan Rock =

Large boulder in Cornwall, United Kingdom

- Men Omborth (Cornish)
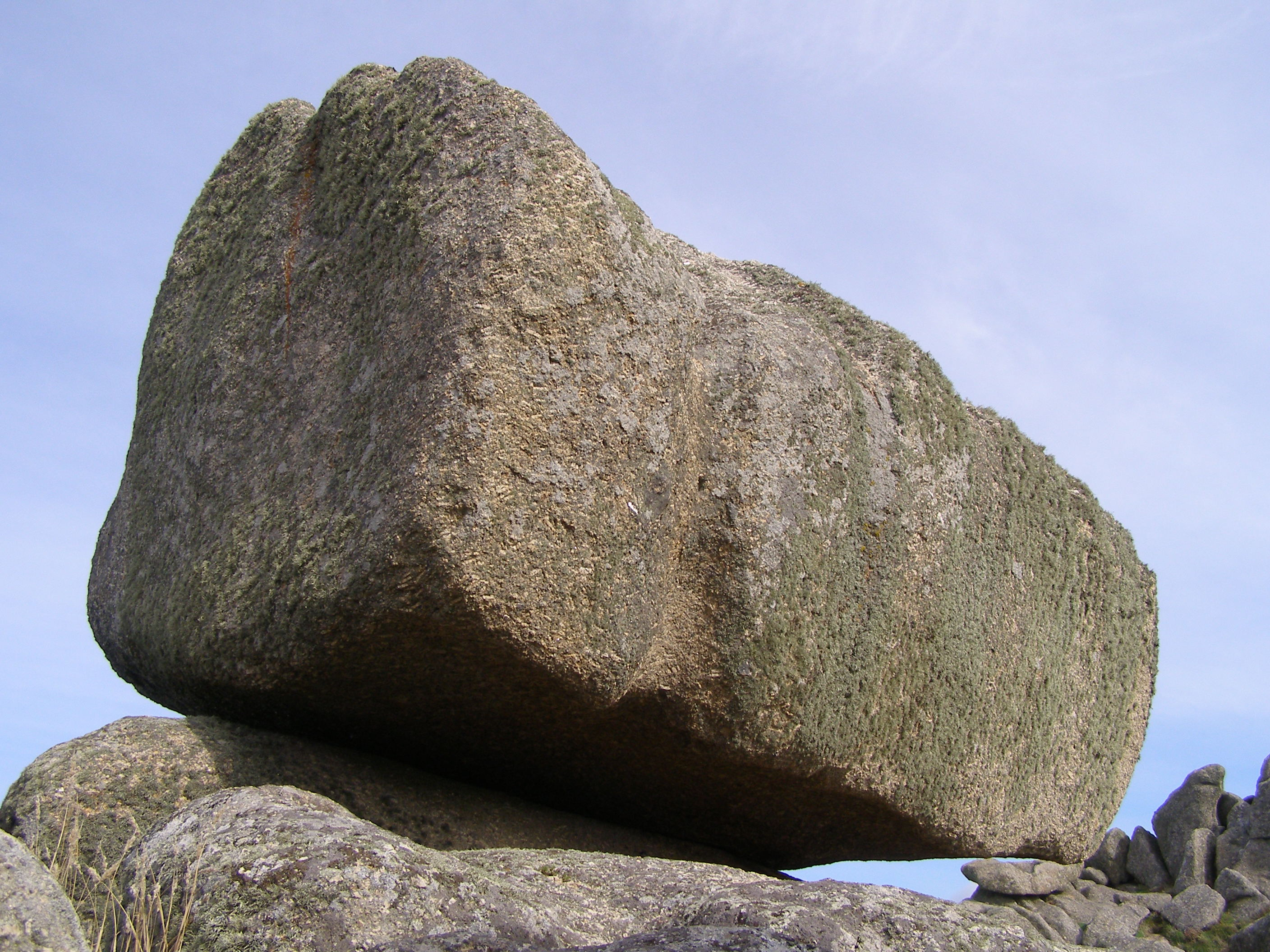
- Close-up of the Logan Rock near Treen

- Location within Southwest Cornwall
- 50.041361°N 5.636468°W
- Type: logan or rocking stone.
- Location: Cornwall

Site notes
- Material: Stone
- Condition: Restored
- Public access: Open

The Logan Rock (Cornish: Men Omborth, meaning balanced stone) near the village of Treen in Cornwall, United Kingdom, is an example of a logan or rocking stone. Although it weighs some 80 tons, it was dislodged in 1824 by a group of British seamen, intent on showing what the Navy could do. However following complaints from local residents for whom the rock had become a tourist attraction and source of income, the seamen were forced to restore it. Today the Logan Rock still rocks, but with much less ease than it did in the past. The South West Coast Path, which follows the coast of south-west England from Somerset to Dorset passes by on the cliffs to the north.

== Geography ==
The rock is a ninety-ton granite boulder perched on the edge of the cliffs overlooking the English Channel, on a headland one mile south of Treen. The rock is within Treryn Dinas, an Iron Age promontory fort, or cliff castle, with five lines of fortification. The rock is finely balanced due to the actions of weathering, and prior to its restoration in 1824 it could be rocked by applying only a little pressure. As well as the logan stone itself, the name Logan Rock is also applied to the surrounding tip of the headland. Cripp's Cove lies to the east beneath the rock. A number of stacks are located around the edge of Logan Rock including Great Goular, Horrace, and Seghy. The area is within the Treen Cliff Site of Special Scientific Interest (SSSI), notified in 1951 for its marine heathland and rare plants. It is within the Cornwall Area of Outstanding Natural Beauty (AONB), the Penwith Heritage Coast and is owned and managed by the National Trust.

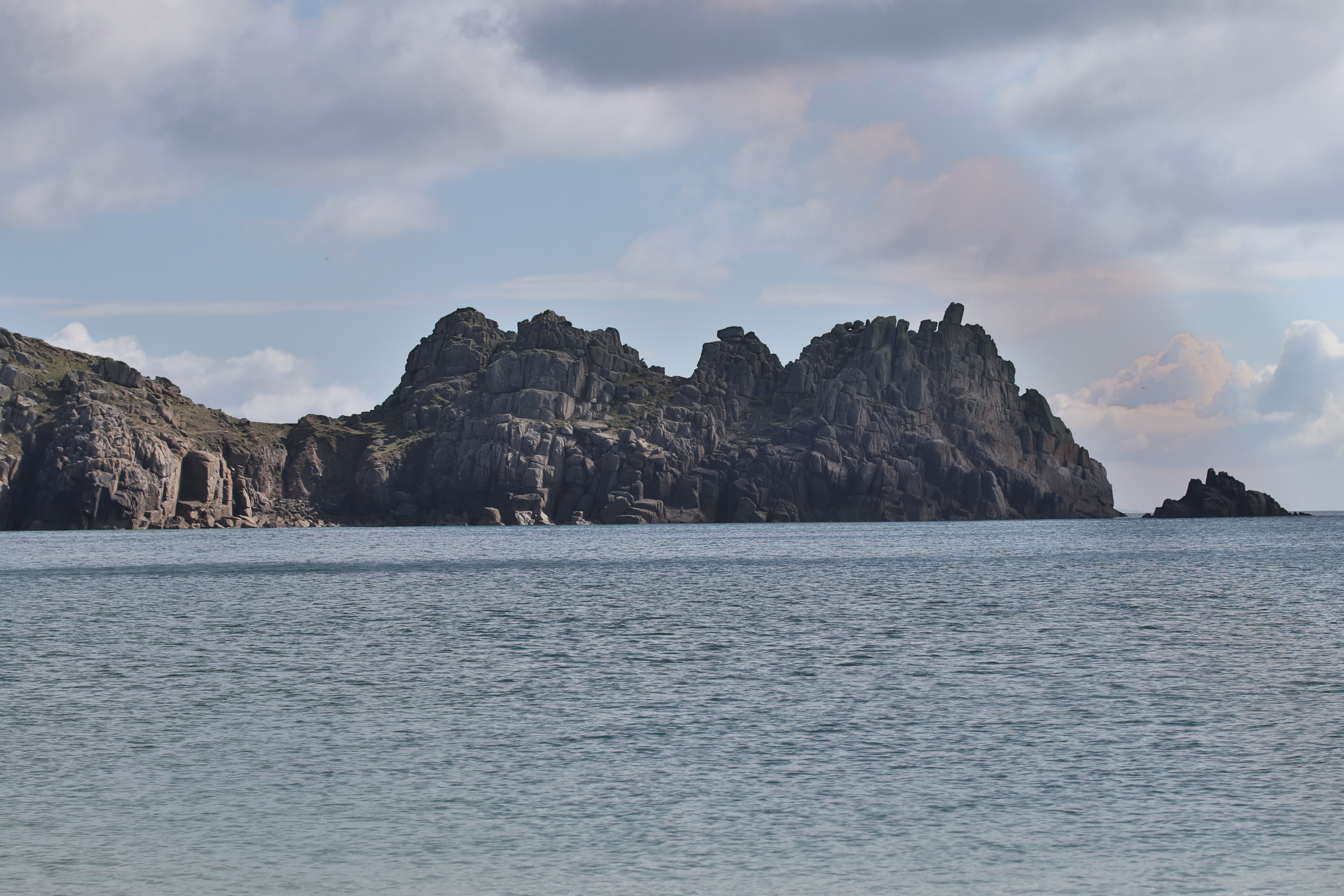
Logan Rock Treen Cornwall

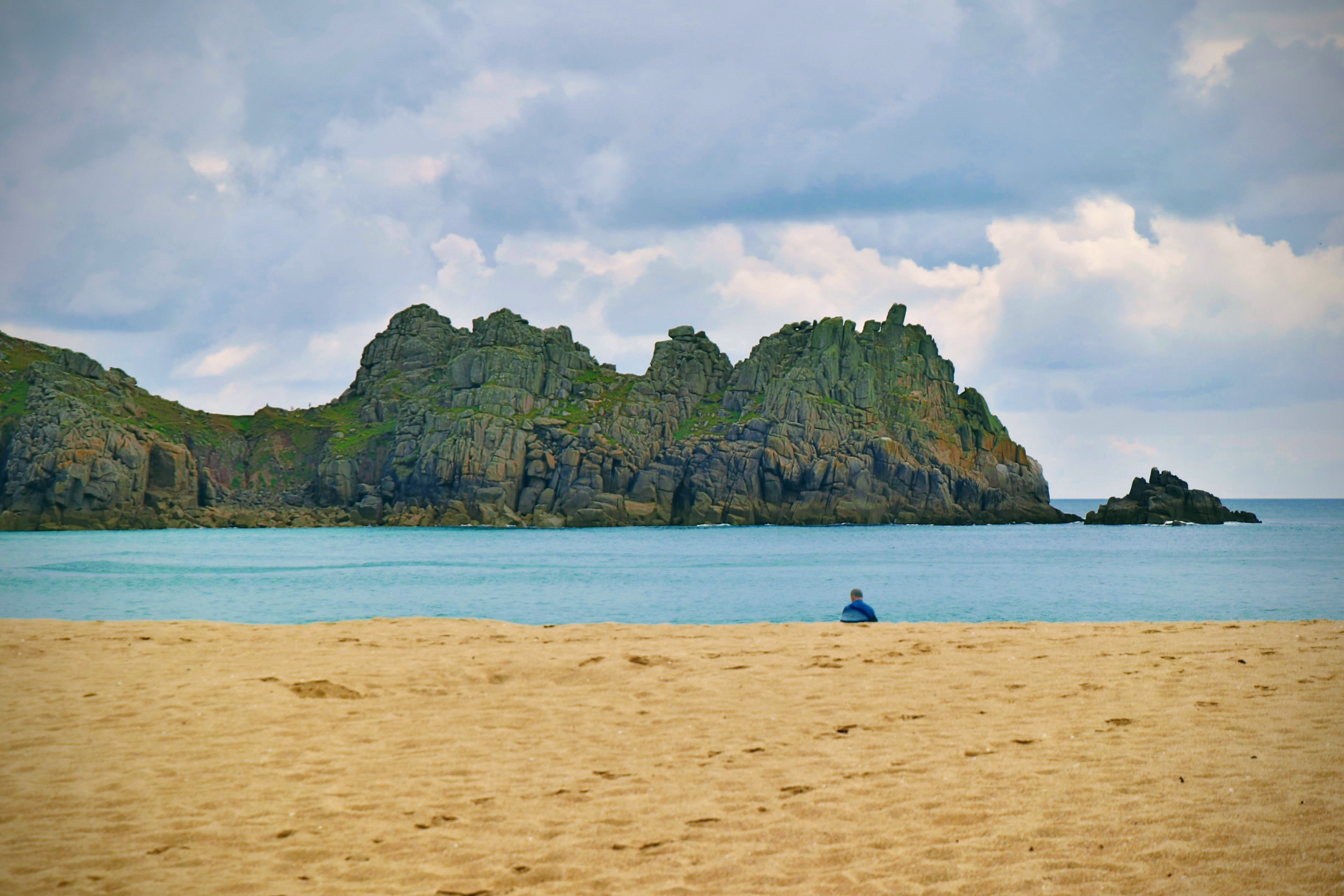
Beach view of Logan Rock Treen Cornwall

The Runnel Stone Marine Conservation Zone was designated on 29 January 2016, covers 7¾ sq. mi. (20 km^{2}) and is based on a 2¼ mile (3.5 km) arc measured from the National Coastwatch Institution lookout based at Gwennap Head. Included is much of the coast from Gwennap Head to Hall Dinas on the east side of Treryn Dinas. The MCZ protects habitats ranging from exposed rock on the coast to soft sediments on the sea floor and animals such as pink sea fan (Eunicella verrucosa) which can be found on the eastern side of the headland.

== Name ==
The original Cornish language name for the rock, recorded in 1870 as Men Amber, is Men Omborth, meaning balanced stone. The word "logan" (properly pronounced "logg-un") is probably derived from the word "log", which in an English dialect means "to rock". In fact, in some parts of the UK, rocking stones or logan stones are called logging stones. Bray, writing in 1832, notes the expression 'to log the child's cradle' in relation to logan stone as an example of ancient British dialect recorded on Dartmoor in Devon.

Some have suggested that it comes from a Cornish expression for the movement that someone makes when drunk. Davies Gilbert writes:

It may be observed that I have always used the words Loging Rock for the celebrated stone at Trereen Dinas. Much learned research seems to have been idly expended on the supposed name, "Logan Rock." To log is a verb in general use throughout Cornwall for vibrating or rolling like a drunken man; and is frequently heard in provincial pronunciation for tug, characteristic of the modern present participle. The Loging Rock is, therefore, strictly descriptive of its peculiar motion.

The Cornish word Leghen means "a thin flat stone", whilst its root word, Legh, can also mean "rickets", a disease caused by deficiency of vitamin D and Calcium which can lead to bone deformity.

It should also be noted that the name for rocking stones could be a modified form of the Danish word "logre," which means 'to wag the tail,' and this suggests possible Norse origin. Danes in particular established a kingdom in Great Britain before 1000 AD, Norway maintained nominal control over the Hebrides in northern Scotland until the late Middle Ages, and Vikings frequently raided along the British coastal areas between 800 and 1000 AD Thus, a Norse origin for the word Logan, while speculative, cannot be ruled out.

== Story of the rock ==
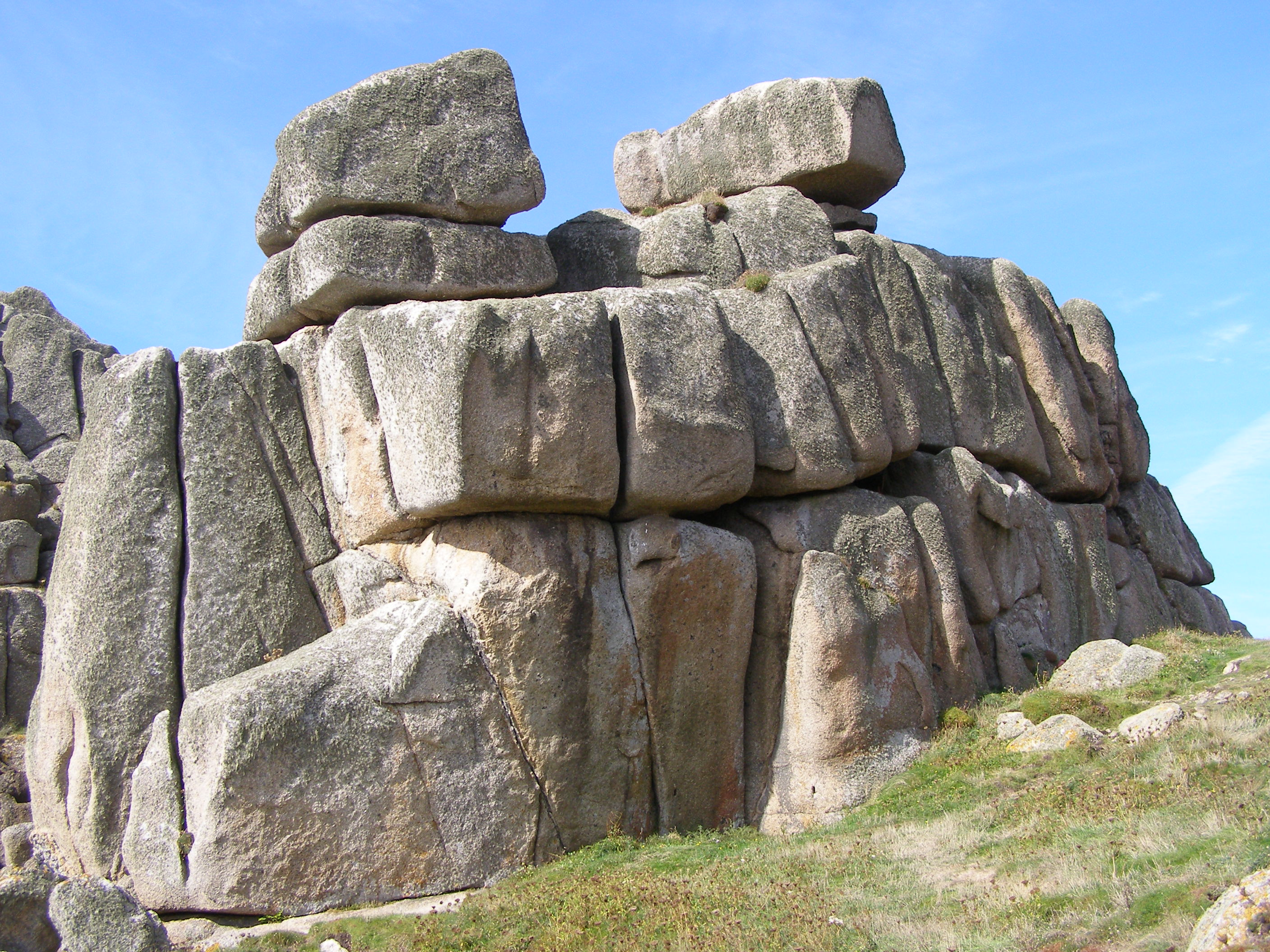
The Logan Rock (top right) in context

The Logan Rock is one of the best known rocking stones for several reasons. For example, Modred, in William Mason's dramatic poem "Caractacus," addressing the characters Vellinus and Elidurus, says of the Logan Rock:

Thither, youths,
Turn your astonish'd eyes; behold yon huge
And unhewn sphere of living adamant,
Which, poised by magic, rests its central weight
On yonder pointed rock: firm as it seems,
Such is the strange and virtuous property,
It moves obsequious to the gentlest touch
Of him whose breast is pure; but to a traitor,
Tho' ev'n a giant's prowess nerv’d his arm,
It stands as fixt as Snowdon.

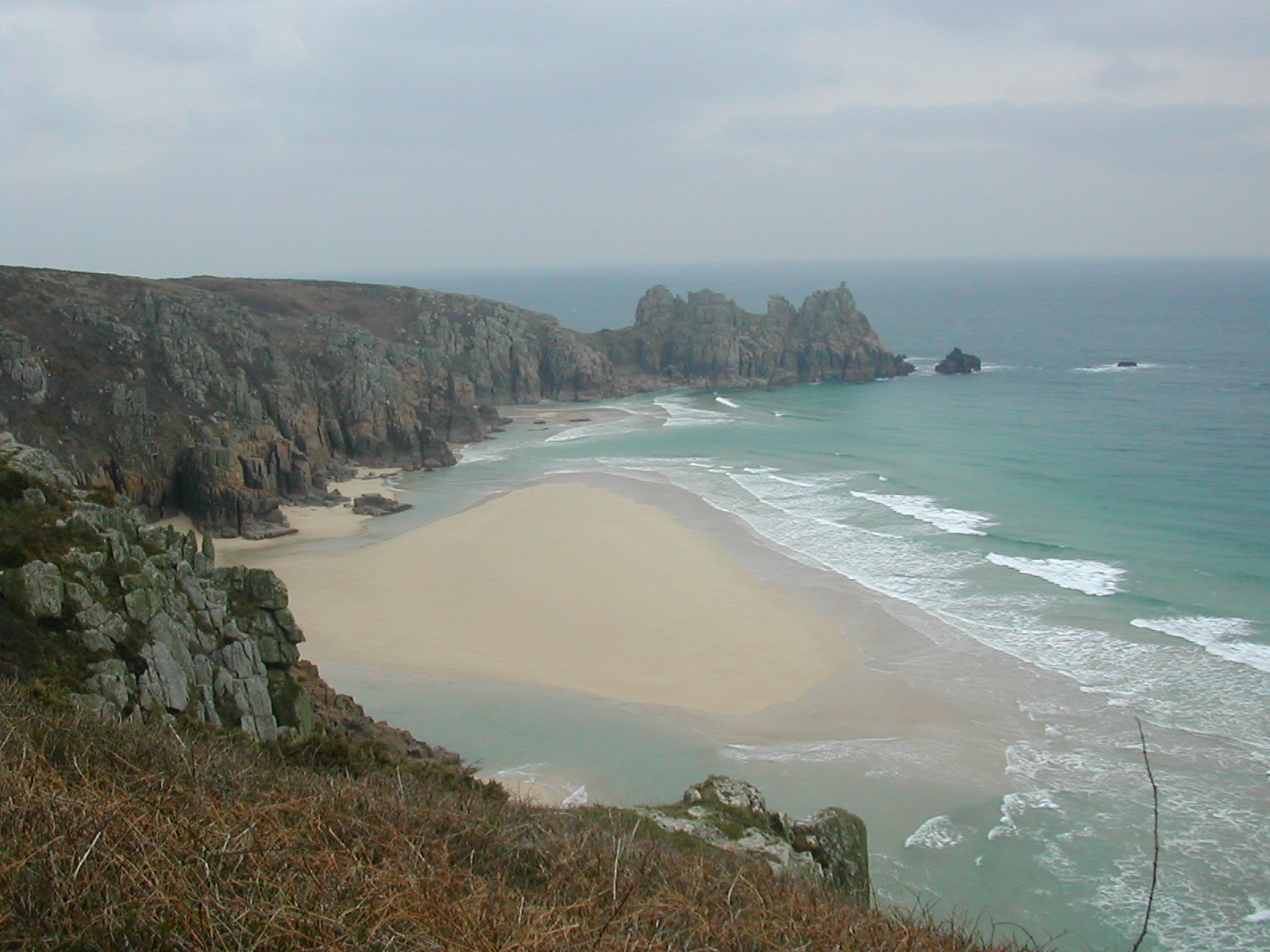
Pednvounder beach with Logan Rock in the background

However, another reason that the Logan Rock of Treen is remembered is that it was the centre of a famous drama. In April 1824, Lieutenant Hugh Goldsmith, R.N. (nephew of the poet Oliver Goldsmith), and ten or twelve of his crew of the cutter HMS Nimble, armed with bars and levers rocked the huge granite boulder until it fell from its cliff-top perch. Goldsmith was apparently motivated to disprove the claim of Dr Borlase, who wrote in Antiquities of Cornwall in 1754 that:

In the parish of S. Levan, there is a promontory called Castle Treryn. This cape consists of three distinct groups of rocks. On the western side of the middle group near the top, lies a very large stone, so evenly, poised that any hand may move it to and fro; but the extremities of its base are at such a distance from each other, and so well secured by their nearness to the stone which it stretches itself upon, that it is morally impossible that any lever, or indeed force, however applied in a mechanical way, can remove it from its present situation.

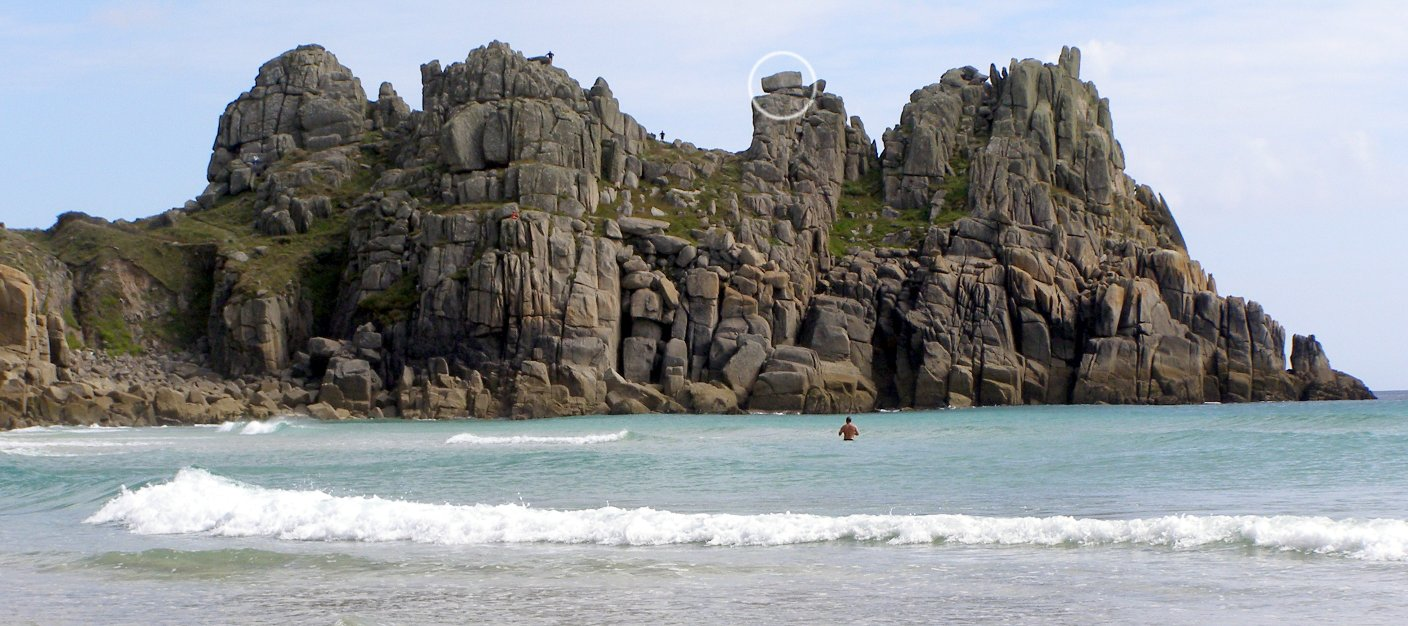
The Logan Rock (circled) from the Pednvounder beach sand bar

Goldsmith was determined to demonstrate that nothing was impossible when the courage and skill of British seamen were engaged. The Logan Rock slid aside and was caught in a narrow crevice (it did not fall from the cliff as claimed by some).

This upset the local residents considerably, since Logan Rock had been used to draw tourists to the area. Treen had become a lucrative tourist destination. Sir Richard R. Vyvyan was particularly unhappy. The local residents demanded that the British Admiralty strip Lieutenant Goldsmith of his Royal Navy commission unless he restored the boulder to its previous position at his own expense.

However, Davies Gilbert persuaded the Lords of the Admiralty to lend Lieutenant Goldsmith the required apparatus for replacing the Logan Rock. The Admiralty sent thirteen capstans with blocks and chains from the dock yard at Plymouth, and contributed £25 towards expenses. Gilbert also raised more funds.

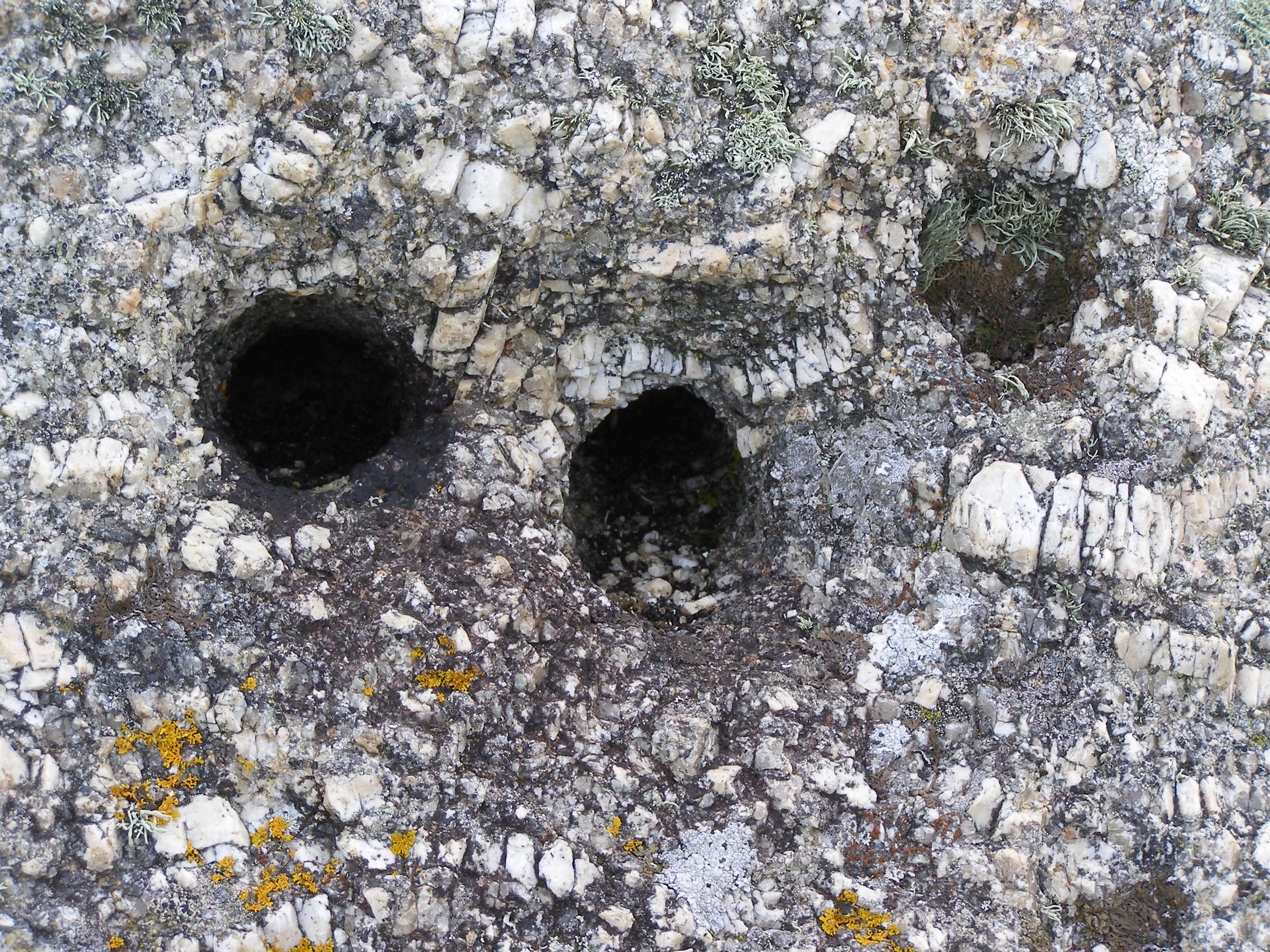
Three anchor holes drilled into the granite next to the Logan Rock

After months of effort, at 4.20pm on Tuesday, 2 November 1824, in front of thousands of spectators and with the help of more than sixty men and block and tackle, the Logan Rock was finally repositioned and returned to "rocking condition" (Michell 1974). Apparently the total final cost of this enterprise was £130 8s 6d. A copy of the original receipt for this expenditure can be found today in The Logan Rock public house in Treen. However, it is not clear how much of the remaining £105 Goldsmith had to make up out of his own pocket.

For some time after, the rock was kept chained and padlocked, but eventually these restrictions were removed, and the rock was set free. Tourism declined and this was blamed on the condition of Logan Rock. For a while, Treen was nicknamed 'Goldsmith's Deserted Village'. The anchor holes used to haul the huge rock back into place are still visible in the surrounding rocks. However, it apparently no longer vibrates or "logs" as easily as it did before. Francis Kilvert on his visit on 27 July 1870:

At the foot of the steep rock on which the Logan Stone is balanced a man stood ready to show the way up, and when he saw me coming he began to run up just like a monkey. His action was so sudden, strange and wild, and so exactly that of a monkey clambering up the bars of his cage, that I looked to see whether he had a tail. He helped me up capitally with knee and hand. I could never have got up by myself for the rock faces were very steep, smooth and slippery. ..... The guide first put his shoulder under the Stone and rocked it, and then I did the same. It rocks perceptibly, though very slightly. But it has never rocked so well and easily since it was wilfully thrown down.

Nonetheless, local historian Craig Weatherhill asserts that a series of rhythmic heaves against the south-western corner of the rock will set it moving, after which, the motion can be kept going with the efforts of one hand. He also mentions another smaller logan on the headland, the Lady Logan Rock, which legend tells is a giantess petrified by curses from the dying husband she had just murdered.

On an 1879 visit, Alfred Phillips of Kilburn, found that he ″ ... was able to shake with little difficulty″.

== In literature and the arts ==
In one of her last works, a biography of her childhood, Virginia Woolf mentions visiting Logan rock with her father and setting it rocking. The episode probably occurred in the early 1890s, when Woolf spent each summer in nearby St Ives.

Logan Rock is described in R.M. Ballantyne's Deep Down.

Inglis Gundry wrote an opera called The Logan Rock which was premiered at the Minack Theatre in 1956 with Edith Coates singing and Marcus Dods conducting.

"Observer", a letter writer to the Cornishman in 1879, uses the "venerable belief of our fore-fathers" who believed in the St Levan witches riding over the Logan Rock, to dispel the contemporary belief, that electric light (which was being introduced to Penzance) was dangerous.

The 1997 album Richard D. James Album by Aphex Twin (who was raised in Cornwall) includes a track called "Logan Rock Witch".

== Gallery for Logan Rock ==
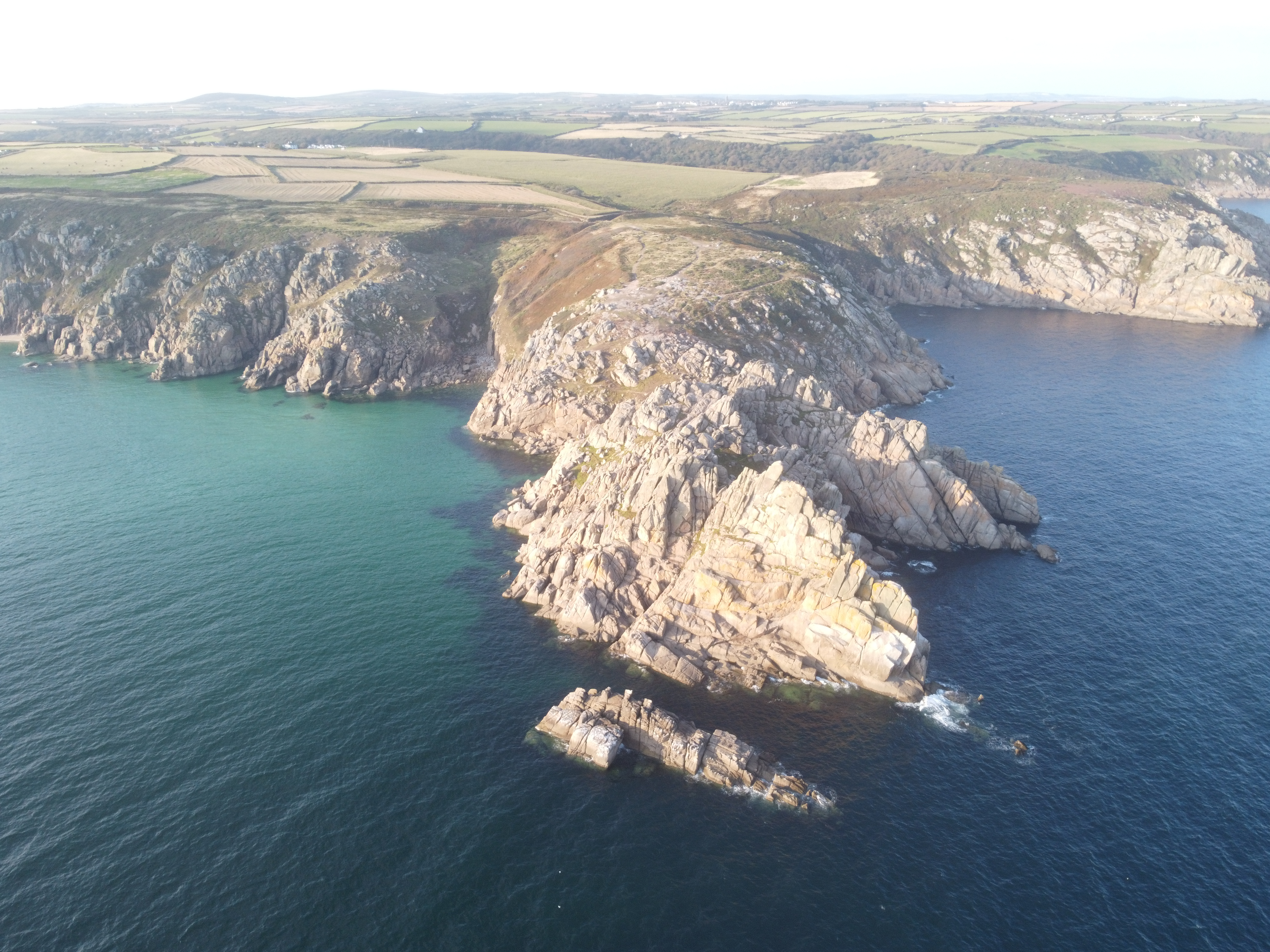

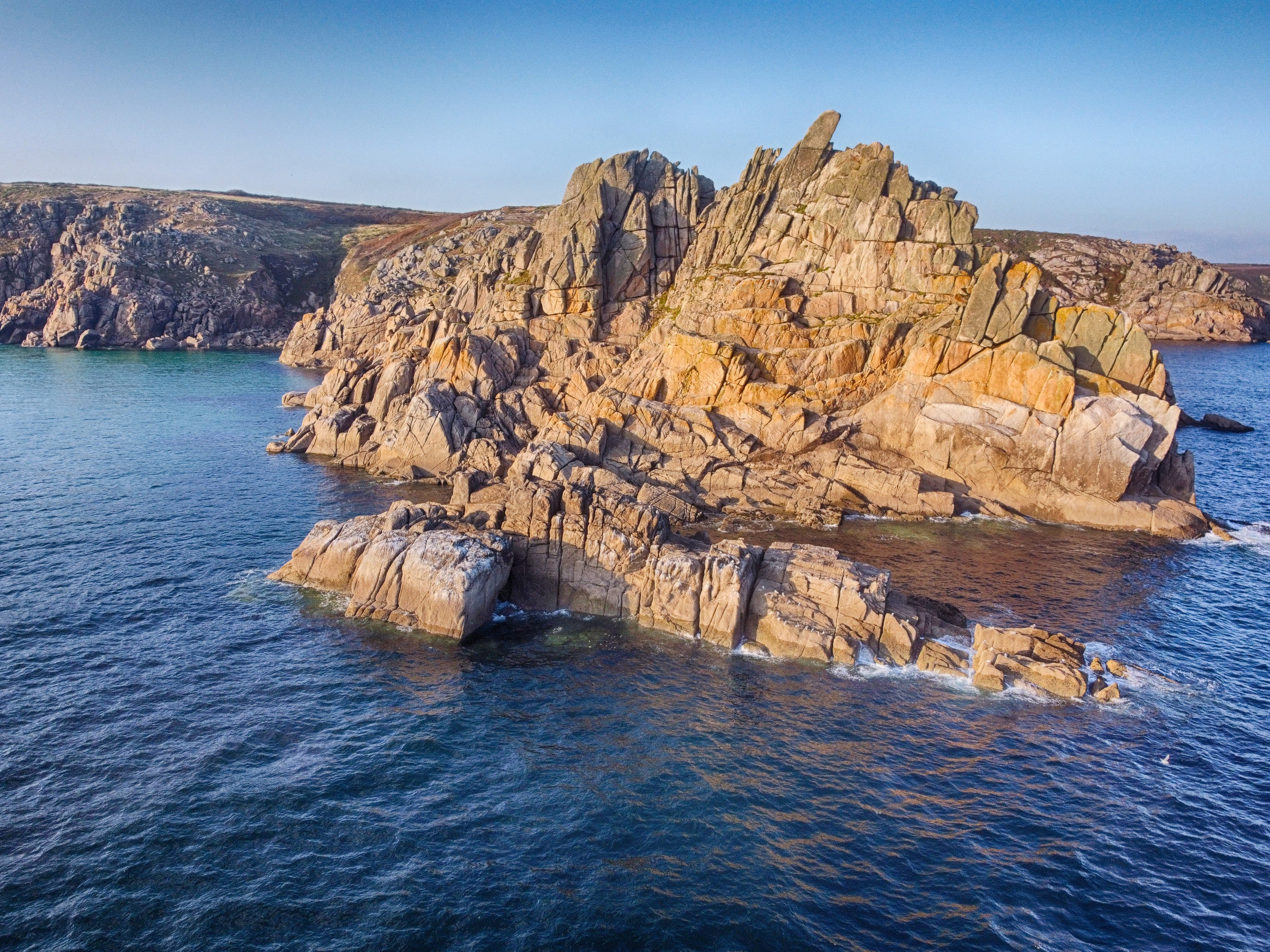

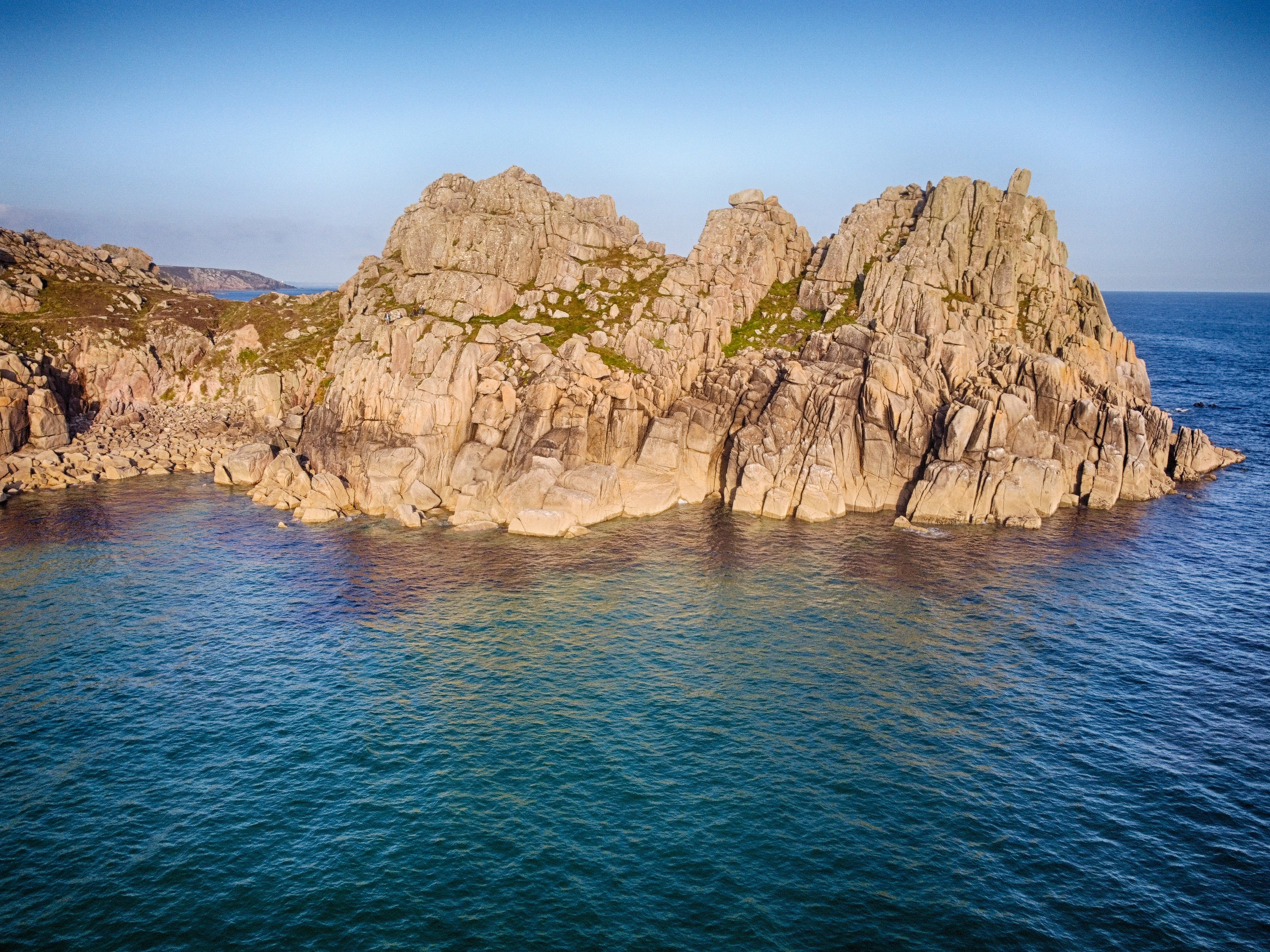

== See also ==
- List of individual rocks
