= HMS Nimble =

Several vessels of the Royal Navy have been named HMS Nimble.

- HMS Nimble (1778) was a 12-gun cutter that was wrecked in 1781 with the loss of 28 men.
- HMS Nimble (1781) was a purchased 12-gun cutter that ran aground in 1808 in Stangate Creek in the Medway and was then sold.
- HMS Nimble (1811) was a Nimble-class 10-gun cutter commissioned wrecked during a violent storm in the Kattegat on 6 October 1812.
- HMS Nimble (1813) was a new cutter that the Royal Navy purchased in 1813. The Navy sold her in 1816.
- HMS Nimble whose crew dislodged the Logan Rock whilst stationed off Land's End in April 1824.
- HMS Nimble (1826) was a 5-gun schooner employed off Cuba in the suppression of the slave trade until she was wrecked on 4 November 1834.
- HMS Nimble (1860) was a gunvessel of 5 guns that had a relatively uneventful career before she became a drill ship for the Royal Naval Reserve in 1890 and was disposed of in 1906.
- HMS Nimble (1906) was built as the excursion steamer Roslin Castle. Acquired 1908 and converted into a tender. Based at Sheerness from 1908, and Chatham from 1922.
- HMS Nimble (W 123) was a rescue tug launched in 1942 and sold in 1968.

== Related vessels ==
There was a revenue cutter Nimble, of Deal, that the French captured and that became the French privateer Dunqerquois. The hired armed cutter Princess Augusta destroyed her on 5 March 1808.
