= Treryn Dinas =

Headland on the south coast of Cornwall, England

- Headland
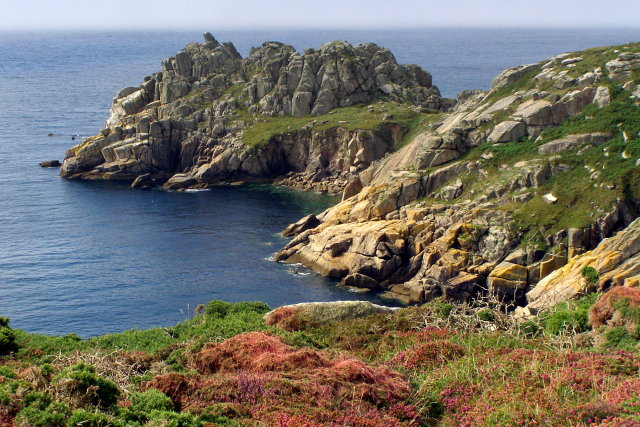
- The headland

- Coordinates: 50°02′30″N 5°38′05″W
- Grid position: SW398220
- Location: Cornwall
- Operator: National Trust
- Designation: Scheduled monument

Treryn Dinas is a headland near Treen, on the Penwith peninsula between Penberth Cove and Porthcurno in Cornwall, England.

It is a scheduled monument, and is owned by the National Trust.

It is the site of a promontory fort dated to the Iron Age. The promontory slopes away steeply to the sea on three sides, and on the landward (north) side there are widely spaced defensive earthworks. The innermost rampart, up to 2 metres (6.6 ft) high, crosses the narrowest part of the headland. Beyond this there are two low curving ramparts, and a massive outer rampart, up to 6.1 metres (20 ft) high, with a ditch on its northern side and a causewayed entrance. The South West Coast Path runs alongside the outer rampart.

On the promontory, Logan Rock is balanced on the rocky terrain about 30 metres (98 ft) above the sea.

This rocky headland is the subject of an engraving of a painting by Thomas Allom entitled Treryn Castle in Fisher's Drawing Room Scrap Book (1833), together with a poetical illustration by Letitia Elizabeth Landon.

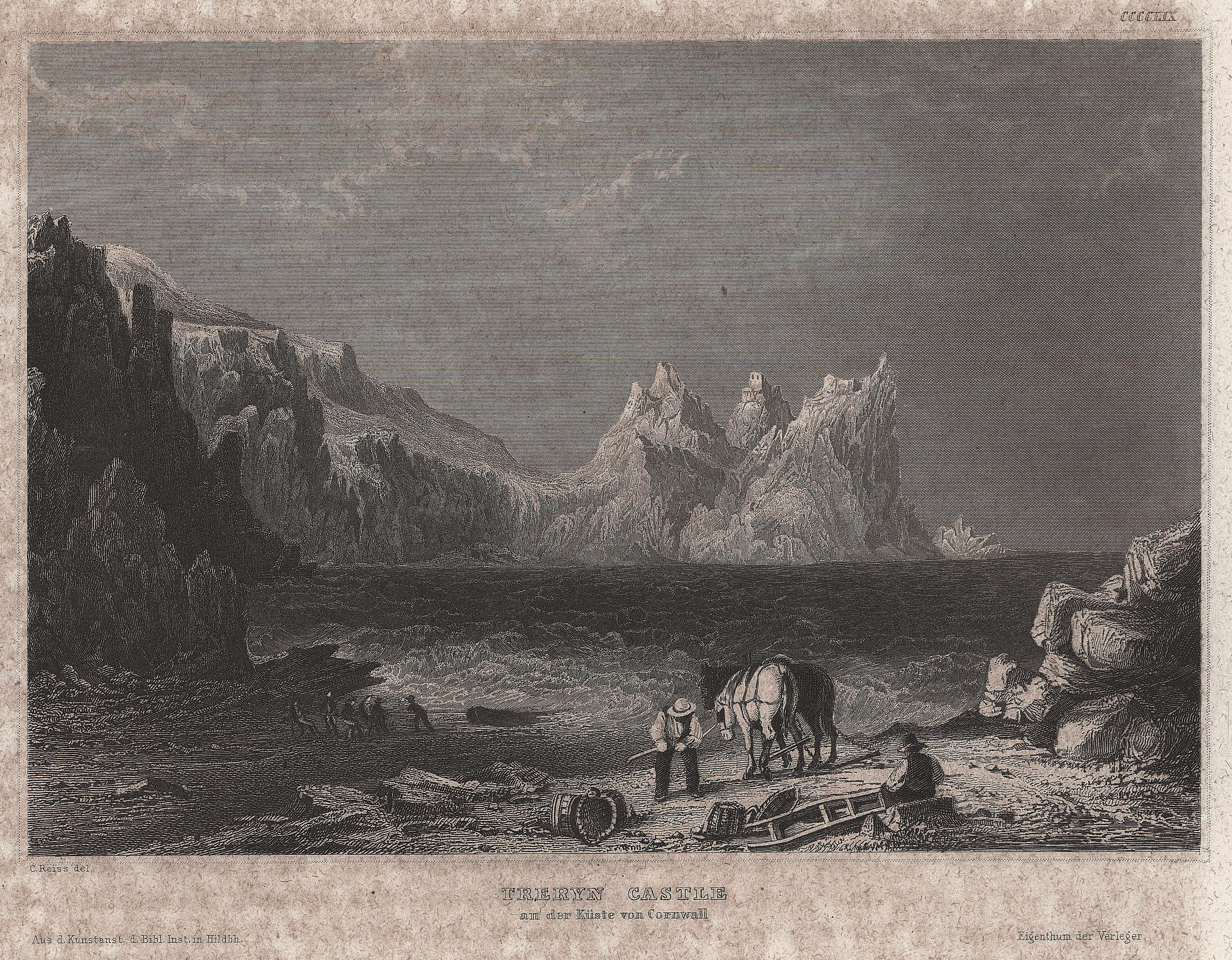
Treryn Castle in Cornwall, from an 1843 engraving
