= Marhamchurch =

Village in north Cornwall, England

Coordinates: 50.805°N 4.521°W

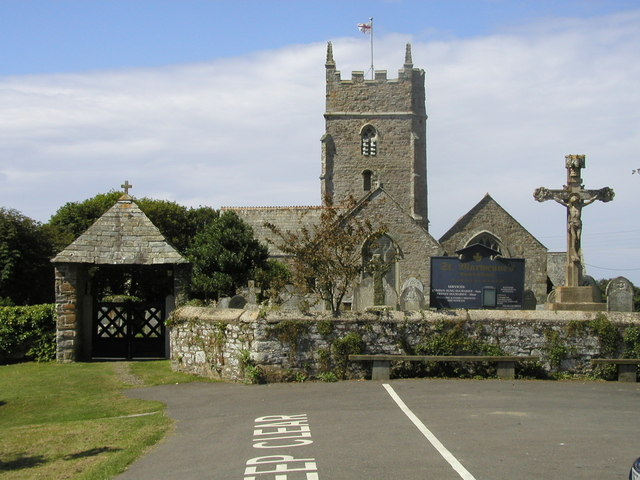
St Marwenne Church, Marhamchurch

Marhamchurch (Cornish: Eglosvarwenn) is a civil parish and village in north Cornwall, England, United Kingdom.

Marhamchurch village is situated 1 1/2 miles (2.4 km) south of Bude off the A39 road. The Civil Parish population at the 2011 census was 837.

== History ==
The name derives from the Celtic Saint Marwenne (Morwenna) who is thought to have founded a hermitage here around the end of the fifth century. Marwenne was one of the twenty-four children of St Brychan, a Welsh saint and king.

Marhamchurch parish church is dedicated to St Marwenne. Most of the present church is of the 14th century; in the 15th century an aisle and porch were added. In the early 15th century the existence of an anchorite's cell occupied by an anchoress called Cecilia Moys is recorded. Features of interest include the four-holed cresset stone and a Norman quarter-capital (though this is unlikely to be a fragment of the Norman church which may have preceded the present building). St Marwenne was probably the same as Morwenna of Morwenstow. In the 9th century the district was probably on the border between Cornwall and Devon as the farms in the parish have Saxon names unlike those of Poundstock on the other side of the River Neet.

Marhamchurch was recorded in the Domesday Book (1086) when it was one of several manors held by Hamelin from Robert, Count of Mortain. There was one virgate of land and land for 2 ploughs. There was one plough, 1 serf, 1 villein, 2 smallholders, 20 acres of pasture and 20 sheep. The value of the manor was 6 shillings though it had formerly been worth 10 shillings.

== Marhamchurch Revel ==
Marhamchurch Revel is a festival held every year, on the Monday after 12 August in Marhamchurch. During the festival a Queen of the Revel is chosen from the village schoolgirls and crowned by Father Time in front of the church where St. Morwenna's cells are said to have stood. Following these events a procession led by the local band and the newly crowned Revel Queen then proceeds through the village to the Revel Ground. Here the villagers are entertained with a show of various entertainments.
