= Wainhouse Corner =

Hamlet in north Cornwall, England

Coordinates: 50°43′49″N 4°34′43″W

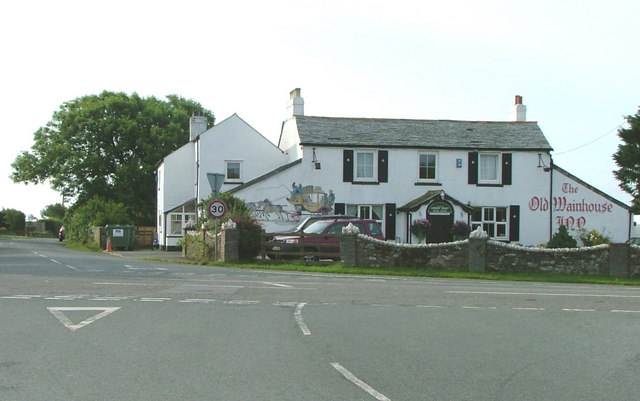
The Old Wainhouse Inn

Wainhouse Corner is a hamlet in north Cornwall, England, United Kingdom. It is at a crossroads on the A39 main road, between Camelford and Bude. Canworthy Water and Crackington Haven are the destinations of the B road.
