= Crackington Haven =

Village in Cornwall, England

Coordinates: 50.74454°N 4.63774°W

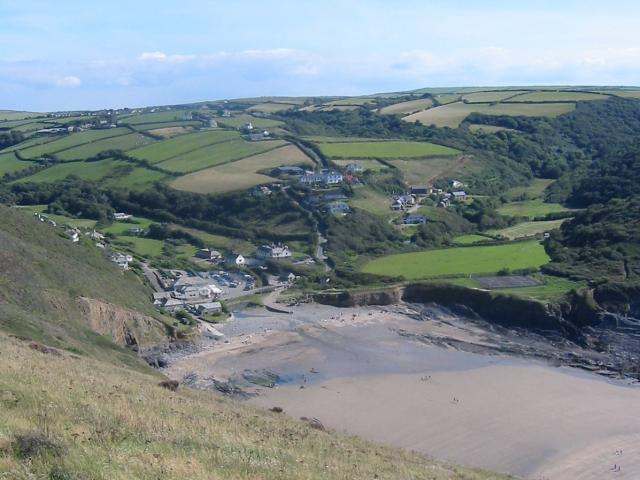
Crackington Haven viewed from Penkenna Point looking south in 2003

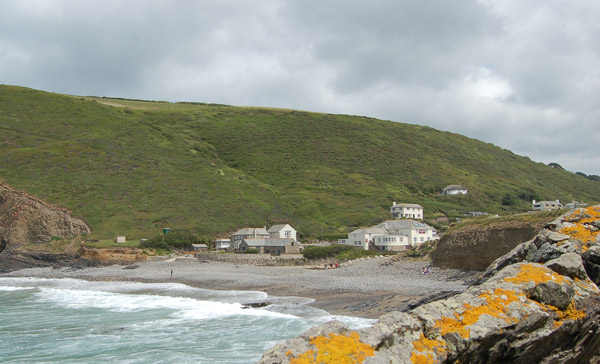
Crackington Haven seen across the beach in 2005

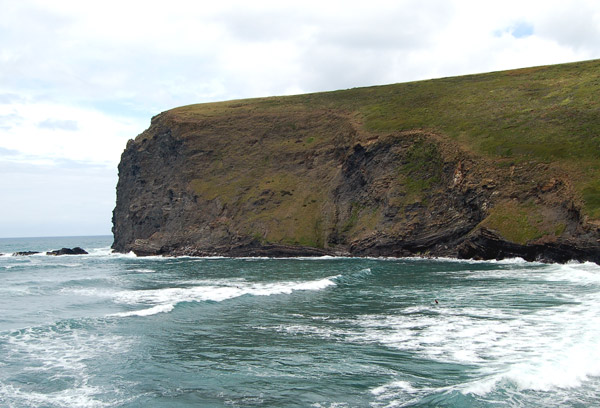
Penkenna Point in 2005 showing the folded strata of the rock

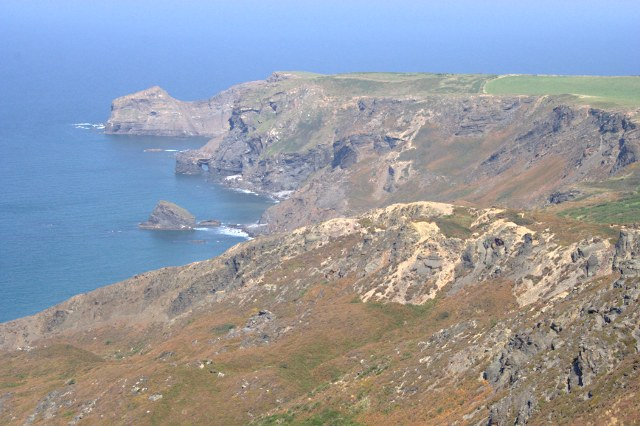
The view from High Cliff towards Cambeak

Crackington Haven (Cornish: Porthkragen, meaning "sandstone cove") is a coastal village in Cornwall, England, United Kingdom. It is in the civil parish of St Gennys at grid reference SX140972 at the head of a cove on the Atlantic coast. The village is seven miles (11 km) south-southwest of Bude and four miles (6.4 km) north-northeast of Boscastle.

Middle Crackington and Higher Crackington are associated settlements. They are situated on the hill southeast of Crackington Haven, half-a-mile and one mile distant respectively.

== Geography ==
Crackington Haven is popular with tourists, walkers, and geology students. The surrounding cliffs are well known for their visible folded sedimentary rock formations. The village gives its name to the Crackington Formation, a sequence of Carboniferous sandstones and grey shales.

The village has two café-style tea rooms, and a pub called the Coombe Barton Inn in a building that was originally the house of a local slate quarry manager.

Crackington Haven has a stony foreshore but a sandy beach is revealed at low water. The local parish council has put up signs asking that people do not remove stones, and saying that people who do will be prosecuted under the 1949 Coastal Protection Act. There are toilet facilities near the beach and lifeguard cover in the summer.

Immediately north of the beach is Pencarrow Point and a few hundred yards south is Cambeak headland (between Tremoutha Haven and Cam Strand); the clifftop here is 328 ft. Cambeak is derived from Old Cornish and means "crooked point". One mile south of Crackington Haven, High Cliff rises to 735 feet (224 m). It is Cornwall's highest cliff, (Great Hangman in Devon has a cliff face of 820 feet (250 m).

Crackington Haven lies within the Cornwall National Landscape (AONB). Almost a third of Cornwall has AONB designation, with the same status and protection as a National Park.

== History ==
The manor of Crackington was recorded in the Domesday Book (1086) when it was one of several manors held by Berner from Robert, Count of Mortain. There was half a hide of land and land for 3 ploughs. There were 1 plough, 2 serfs, 6 smallholders, 4 acres of underwood, 20 acres of pasture, 4 cattle, 3 pigs and 25 sheep. The value of the manor was 10 shillings though it had formerly been worth £1 sterling.

Until the nineteenth century, Crackington Haven was a small port similar to many others on the north coast of Cornwall. Limestone and coal were imported and slate and other local produce were exported. After the railways reached the district in 1893 the village could be reached more easily (from the North Cornwall Railway station at Otterham) so holidaymaking became more common.

Crackington Haven was badly affected by the 2004 flood that damaged several other villages, notably Boscastle. The road bridge across the stream, several homes and the pub were damaged by floodwater.
