= St Gennys =

Village in Cornwall, England

Coordinates: 50.744°N 4.624°W

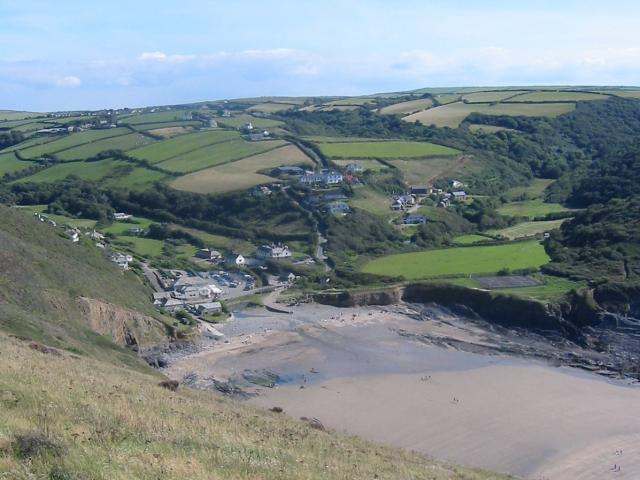
A wide view across St Gennys parish with Crackington Haven in the foreground

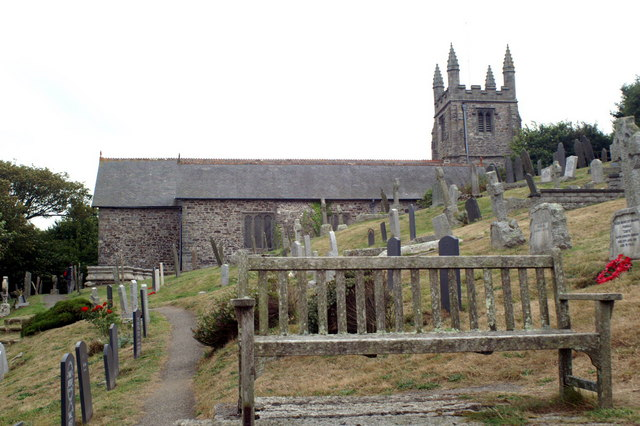
St Gennys parish church (1)

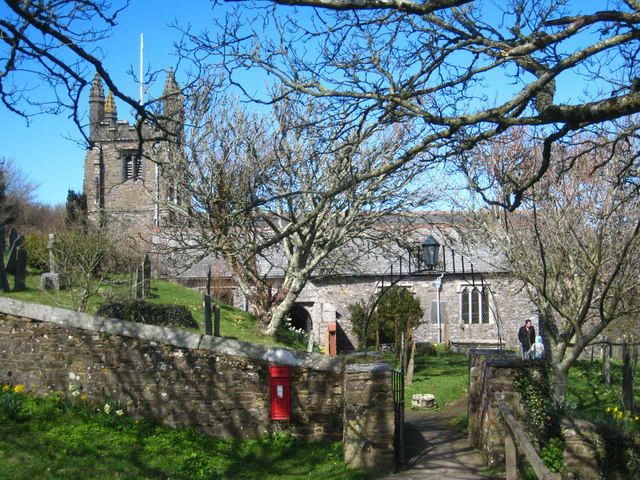
St Gennys parish church (2)

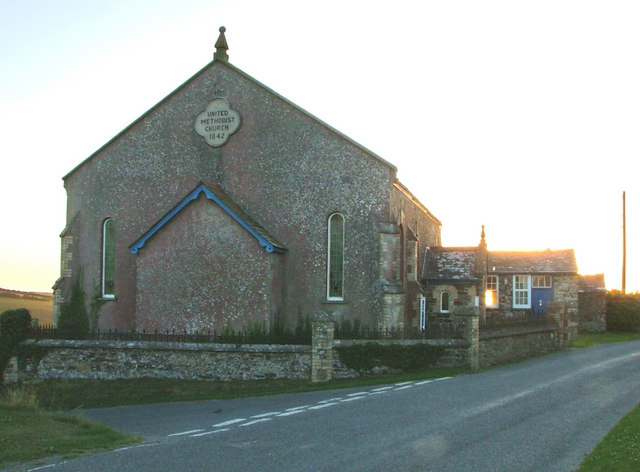
Brockhill United Methodist Church

St Gennys (Cornish: S. Gwynnas) is a coastal civil parish and small settlement in north Cornwall, England, United Kingdom.

The village of St Gennys is about seven miles (11 km) southwest of Bude. It is on high ground half-a-mile north of the coastal village of Crackington Haven, the major settlement in the parish. The only other settlements of any size in the parish are Middle Crackington and Higher Crackington both of which are southeast of Crackington Haven, half-a-mile and one mile distant respectively. The population of the parish at the 2011 census was 873.

== History and geography ==
The name St Gennys is generally thought to derive from 4th Century Christian martyr Saint Genesius although it has been suggested that the commemoration is to the Welsh Saint Gwynws. In either case the name is old and several places in the parish are mentioned in the Domesday Book including Crackington (as Crachemua), Dizzard (as Disart) and St Gennys itself (as Sainguinas or Sanwinas) To the west St Gennys is bounded by the Atlantic coast where Cornwall's highest cliff (appropriately named High Cliff) rises 735 feet (224 m) above the rocky foreshore. Cambeak is a prominent headland and the cliffs at the Strangles are a National Trust property. In one year in the 1820s it is believed 23 ships were wrecked on this part of the coast.

The parish, which had a recorded population of 873 in the 2011 census, is in Stratton Registration District and lies within the Cornwall Area of Outstanding Natural Beauty (AONB); almost a third of Cornwall has AONB designation with the same status and protection as a National Park. Away from the coast St Gennys parish is entirely rural and is bordered to the north by Poundstock parish, to the east by Jacobstow parish, and to the south by Otterham and St Juliot parishes.

The manor of St Gennys was recorded in the Domesday Book (1086) when it was one of several manors held by Jovin from Robert, Count of Mortain; before 1066 it had been held by Gytha who also held Poundstock. There was half a hide of land and land for 10 ploughs. There were 3 ploughs, 3 serfs, 2 villeins, 8 smallholders, 40 acres of pasture, 7 cattle, 40 sheep and 6 goats. The value of the manor was £1 sterling.

== Parish church ==
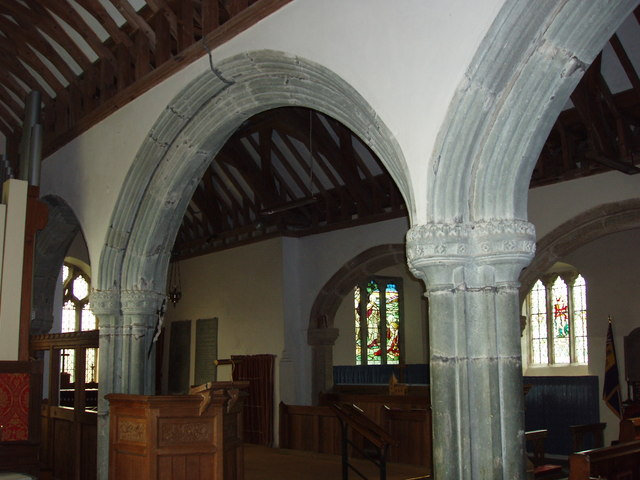
The north aisle arches

The parish church is situated on a sloping site in St Gennys village at grid reference SX 148 971. It is dedicated to Saint Genesius. The building is partly Norman with a short one-stage tower topped by a pyramidal roof. The tower houses a ring of four bells. The church was restored in 1871. The arcades of the aisles are partly in granite and partly in Polyphant stone.

In 1727 it was recorded that St Gennys vicarage was built of stone and cob; this building was replaced in 1734. George Thomson was vicar of St Gennys for 50 years, from 1732 to 1782. Early in his ministry at St Gennys he experienced dreams which deepened his religious faith. He became acquainted with George Whitefield who came to preach at St Gennys more than once. Thomson did not restrict his ministry to his own parish but also preached in nearby parishes until he was admonished by the bishop for doing so.

== Notable residents ==
Laurence Braddon (died 1724), was an English politician and writer, the second son of William Braddon of Treworgy in St Gennys.
