= List of shipwrecks in January 1867 =

The list of shipwrecks in January 1867 includes ships sunk, foundered, grounded, or otherwise lost during January 1867.

== 1 January ==
List of shipwrecks: 1 January 1867
Ship	State	Description
Alexander	United Kingdom	The ship was driven ashore and wrecked at Great Yarmouth, Norfolk. She was on a voyage from London to Hartlepool, County Durham.
Athlete	United Kingdom	The ship was driven ashore and wrecked at Flamborough Head, Yorkshire.
Bonny Lass	United Kingdom	The smack was run down and sunk in the North Sea off Cromer, Norfolk by Mary Mack (United Kingdom) with the loss of a crew member.
Charlotte	United Kingdom	The brig was wrecked at Flamborough Head, Yorkshire. Her four crew were rescued.
Chase	United Kingdom	The brig was wrecked at Horsey, Norfolk. Her five crew were rescued by the Palling Lifeboat. She was on a voyage from London to South Shields, County Durham. Chase was refloated on 8 January.
Cortes	United States	The steamship foundered off Lewes, Delaware. Her crew were rescued. She was on a voyage from New York to Havana, Cuba.
Courier	United Kingdom	The ship was driven ashore in the Kerkennah Islands, Beylik of Tunis. She was on a voyage from Athens, Greece to an English port. She was refloated the next day.
Daring	United Kingdom	The brig ran aground on the Goodwin Sands, Kent. She was refloated and put in to Dover, Kent in a leaky condition.
Eburn	United Kingdom	The ship was driven ashore at Filey, Yorkshire. She was on a voyage from Boston, Lincolnshire to Blyth, Northumberland. She was refloated and taken in to Scarborough, Yorkshire.
Eclipse	United Kingdom	The ship was driven ashore on the Mull of Galloway, Wigtownshire. Her crew were rescued. She was on a voyage from Dundalk, County Louth to Ardrossan, Ayrshire. She was later refloated and taken in to Dromore, County Down.
Ellerslie	United Kingdom	The barque was abandoned in the North Sea 200 nautical miles (370 km) north east of the Tynemouth Castle, Northumberland. Her crew were rescued by Resolution (United Kingdom). Ellerslie was on a voyage from Helsingborg, Sweden to London. She was towed in to West Hartlepool, County Durham in a derelict condition on 3 January.
Exodus	United Kingdom	The ship ran aground on the Nord Sandbank, near Cuxhaven.
Flora	United Kingdom	The ship was run into by the steamship Lord Cardigan (United Kingdom) and sank at Hull, Yorkshire with the loss of a crew member.
George	United Kingdom	The schooner was driven ashore and wrecked at Bangor, County Down. Her crew were rescued. She was on a voyage from Ardrossan, Ayrshire to Runcorn, Cheshire.
I. O.	United Kingdom	The barque was driven ashore and severely damaged at Ramsey, Isle of Man. She was on a voyage from Liverpool, Lancashire to Barbados. She became a wreck on 5 January.
Isabella	United Kingdom	The ship ran aground at Halifax, Nova Scotia.
Lucilla	United Kingdom	The ship was driven ashore at Donaghadee, County Down.
Lucy Ann	United Kingdom	The Yorkshire Billyboy was driven ashore and wrecked at Great Yarmouth. She was on a voyage from Maldon, Essex to Goole, Yorkshire.
Nangatuck	United States	The steamboat sank in the Ohio River. All on board were rescued.
Queen of the Ocean	United Kingdom	The ship was run down and sunk in the North Sea 25 nautical miles (46 km) off South Shields by the steamship City of Paris (United Kingdom) with the loss of eighteen of her nineteen crew. Queen of the Ocean was on a voyage from Liverpool to South Shields.
Veina Nickerson	United States	The ship was driven ashore south of Boston, Massachusetts. She was on a voyage from Smyrna, Ottoman Empire to Boston.
Venue	United Kingdom	The ship was driven ashore and wrecked at Drogheda, County Louth. Her crew were rescued. She was on a voyage from Maryport, Cumberland to Killyleagh, County Down.
Two unnamed vessels	India	An East Indian Railway Company (EIR) steamship struck a sunken wreck and sank in the Hooghly River. Another EIR steamship struck the wreck and sank whilst going to her aid. At least 26 people were killed.

== 2 January ==
List of shipwrecks: 2 January 1867
Ship	State	Description
Berbice	United Kingdom	The ship was driven ashore near Larne, County Antrim. She was on a voyage from the Clyde to Havana, Cuba. She broke up on 9 January.
Catherine Porter	United Kingdom	The ship ran aground on the Kish Bank, in the Irish Sea with the loss of four of her six crew. Survivors were rescued by the Wicklow Lightship ( Trinity House). Catherine Porter floated off and was driven ashore.
Ceylon	United Kingdom	The brig struck the pier at Dover, Kent and was severely damaged. She was on a voyage from Dunkirk, Nord, France to Sunderland, County Durham.
Ellida	United Kingdom	The ship ran aground on the Goodwin Sands, Kent. She was on a voyage from South Shields, County Durham to Palermo, Sicily, Italy. She was refloated and taken in to Harwich, Essex in a severely leaky condition.
Fille de l'Air	France	The barque ran aground at Galveston, Texas, United States. She was on a voyage from Galveston to Liverpool, Lancashire, United Kingdom. She was refloated on 7 January.
Hope	United Kingdom	The Mersey Flat sank at Liverpool.
Lady Ann Kerr	United Kingdom	The brig sank in the Irish Sea off the coast of County Antrim.
Mette	Denmark	The galiot was driven ashore at Blyth, Northumberland, United Kingdom. She was on a voyage from Nyköping, Sweden to Leith, Lothian, United Kingdom.
Rosetta	United Kingdom	The steamship collided with the steamship Calabar (United Kingdom and was beached at Egremont, Lancashire. She was on a voyage from Liverpool, Lancashire to Alexandria, Egypt. She was refloated the next day and taken in to Liverpool.
Star of the West	United Kingdom	The fishing lugger collided with the fishing lugger Mira (United Kingdom) and foundered in the English Channel off Plymouth, Devon. Her six crew were rescued by Mira.
Zior	United Kingdom	The barque was driven ashore at wrecked at Fécamp, Seine-Inférieure, France with the loss of a crew member. She was on a voyage from West Hartlepool, County Durham to Fécamp.

== 3 January ==
List of shipwrecks: 3 January 1867
Ship	State	Description
Actif	France	The ship departed from Liverpool, Lancashire, United Kingdom for Nantes, Loire-Inférieure. No further trace, presumed foundered with the loss of all hands.
Adelaide	United Kingdom	The schooner was driven ashore and wrecked at the Point Lynas Lighthouse, Anglesey. Her crew were rescued. She was on a voyage from Liverpool to the British Cameroons.
Ann and Charlotte	United Kingdom	The sloop was wrecked on Scroby Sands, Norfolk. Her four crew were rescued. She was on a voyage from Goole, Yorkshire to Maidstone, Kent.
Brenda	United Kingdom	The ship ran aground at Hartlepool, County Durham. She was on a voyage from London to Hartlepool.
British Banner	United Kingdom	The barque ran aground at Hartlepool. She was on a voyage from Almería, Spain to Newcastle upon Tyne, Northumberland.
Claire and Marie	United Kingdom	The ship was driven ashore and wrecked on the Black Hall Rocks, on the coast of County Durham near Hartlepool. Her crew were rescued. She was on a voyage from Nantes, Loire-Inférieure, France to Newcastle upon Tyne.
Fame	United Kingdom	The ship was driven ashore between Wissant and Cap Gris Nez, Pas-de-Calais, France. She was on a voyage from South Shields, County Durham to Abbeville, Somme, France. She had become a wreck by 29 January.
Flora	United Kingdom	The ship was driven ashore on Skagen, Denmark. She was on her maiden voyage, from Riga, Russia to Kirkcaldy, Fife.
Forerunner	United Kingdom	The barque was driven ashore and wrecked on Siargao, Spanish East Indies with the loss of thirteen of her fifteen crew. She was on a voyage from Swansea, Glamorgan to Hong Kong.
Huron	United States	The ship was wrecked on Long Island, New York. She was on a voyage from Cárdenas, Cuba to New York City.
Louise	Stettin	The barque was abandoned 50 nautical miles (93 km) off Harboøre, Denmark. She was on a voyage from Hull, Yorkshire to Stettin.
Magdalena	Rostock	The galiot was wrecked at Goswick, Northumberland, United Kingdom. Her crew were rescued. She was on a voyage from Christiania, Norway to Grangemouth, Stirlingshire.
Marianne Shifornaine	France	The lugger foundered nine miles north of Govrevy Point, Cornwall, United Kingdom while bound for Nantes, Loire-Inférieure from Cardiff, Glamorganwith coal and other, unspecified cargo. Three of the four crew lost their lives.
Monitor	United Kingdom	The ship was wrecked on the Quilon Rocks. She was on a voyage from Singapore, Straits Settlements to Bombay, India.
Oporto	United Kingdom	The ship departed from Holyhead, Anglesey for Poole, Dorset. No further trace, presumed foundered with the loss of all hands.
Patriarch	Netherlands	The barque ran aground in the Bangka Strait. She was on a voyage from Cardiff to Singapore, Straits Settlements. She was refloated and completed her voyage.
Resource	Prussia	The barque was driven ashore on Skagen, Denmark. She was on a voyage from Memel to Dublin, United Kingdom.
Rose	United Kingdom	The ship was driven ashore at Millisle, County Down. She was on a voyage from the Clyde to Dublin.
Village Maid	United Kingdom	The schooner was driven ashore at Malin Head, County Donegal. Her crew were rescued. She was on a voyage from Wick, Caithness to Cork.

== 4 January ==
List of shipwrecks: 4 January 1867
Ship	State	Description
Ann	United Kingdom	The schooner foundered with the loss of all hands.
Isabella	United Kingdom	The ship departed from Holyhead, Anglesey for Plymouth, Devon. No further trace, presumed foundered with the loss of all hands.
Mizpah	United Kingdom	The schooner ran aground on the Goodwin Sands, Kent. Her eight crew were rescued by the brig Faith (United Kingdom). They took to their boat the next day and were rescued by the Ramsgate Lifeboat Bradford ( Royal National Lifeboat Institution). She was on a voyage from Amsterdam, North Holland, Netherlands to Genoa, Italy. She floated off and was taken in to Ramsgate, Kent by four luggers.
Sicilia	United Kingdom	The steamship departed from Milford Haven, Pembrokeshire for Glasgow. Presumed foundered with the loss of all 22 crew; a boat with a dead sailor on board was discovered off Islay on 12 January.
Sisters	United Kingdom	The schooner was destroyed by fire in Lochiel. She was on a voyage from Riga, Russia to Londonderry.
Thomas and Eliza	United Kingdom	The smack was driven ashore at Cushendun, County Antrim. Her crew were rescued. She was on a voyage from Irvine, Ayrshire to Belfast, County Antrim.
Thomas Hayden	United Kingdom	The ship was driven ashore at Terneuzen, Zeeland, Netherlands. She was on a voyage from the River Wear to Ghent, East Flanders, Belgium.

== 5 January ==
List of shipwrecks: 5 January 1867
Ship	State	Description
Adelaide Cann	United Kingdom	The ship was driven ashore at Millisle, County Down.
Alma	Greece	The brig was driven ashore at Pennarth Point, Cornwall, United Kingdom.
Alvarado	Spain	The steamship was driven ashore at Larne, County Antrim, United Kingdom. She was on a voyage from Barcelona to Liverpool, Lancashire, United Kingdom. She was refloated.
Ann	United Kingdom	The schooner capsized at Saundersfoot, Pembrokeshire with the loss of her captain.
Annie	United Kingdom	The schooner ran aground on the North Rock. She was on a voyage from Ayr to Drogheda, County Louth. She was refloated and resumed her voyage.
Auxilar	United Kingdom	The ship struck rocks at St. Mary's, Isles of Scilly and was damaged. She was on a voyage from Alexandria, Egypt to London. She was placed under repair at St. Mary's.
Capricorn	United Kingdom	The schooner was driven ashore and wrecked at Maughold Head, Isle of Man. Her crew were rescued. She was on a voyage from Barrow-in-Furness, Lancashire to Newport, Monmouthshire.
Carola, or J. M. Carola	Sweden	The brigantine was driven ashore and wrecked near Gyllyngvase Cornwall with the loss of one of her eight crew. She was on a voyage from Rio de Janeiro, Brazil to Hamburg.
Charles Green	United Kingdom	The schooner was driven ashore at St. Mawes, Cornwall.
Charlotte Ann	United Kingdom	The schooner was driven ashore and wrecked near Port Madoc, Caernarfonshire. Her crew were rescued. She was on a voyage from Garston, Lancashire to Port Madoc.
Cherub	United Kingdom	The ship was driven ashore in Mount's Bay, Cornwall. She had become a wreck by 10 January.
Clara C.	United Kingdom	The schooner ran aground on the Maplin Sand, in the North Sea off the coast of Essex.
Cordelia	United Kingdom	The ship was driven ashore in Mount's Bay with the loss of all but one of her crew. She had become a wreck by 10 January.
Daring	United Kingdom	The schooner was driven ashore and wrecked at Contrary Head, 2 nautical miles (3.7 km) south of Peel, Isle of Man. Her crew were rescued. She was on a voyage from Cardiff, Glamorgan to Belfast, County Antrim.
Daring	United Kingdom	The schooner ran aground on the Grass Bank, in the English Channel off the coast of Dorset. She was refloated on 8 January.
Earl of Devon	United Kingdom	The collier was driven into by the collier schooners Vesper and Helen (both United Kingdom) and was scuttled at Penzance.
Eliza	United Kingdom	The schooner, heading for Devoran, Cornwall from a Welsh port with coal, lost her foremast and maintopmast in a gale, and attempted to make for St Ives, Cornwall. She anchored between Gurnard's Head and the Three Oar Stone but was blown back out to sea, where the steamship Cólon (Spain) took off all of her crew of seven, bar one man, Richard Bawden, who fell overboard and drowned. The Eliza sank off Plymouth.
Eliza	United Kingdom	The schooner was driven ashore at St. Mawes, Cornwall. She was refloated.
Emblem	United Kingdom	The trawling sloop was abandoned off Looe, Cornwall with the loss of four of her five crew. She then drove ashore with the loss of her captain.
Emild	United Kingdom	The ship was driven ashore in Mount's Bay. She had become a wreck by 10 January.
Favourite	United Kingdom	The schooner was driven ashore and severely damaged at Hakin Point, Pembrokeshire. Her crew were rescued. She was on a voyage from Cardiff, Glamorgan to Kingston, Jamaica. She was refloated on 7 January and taken in to Hakin Pill.
Gazelle	United Kingdom	The ship was wrecked at Newcastle, County Down. Her crew were rescued. She was on a voyage from Whitehaven, Cumberland to Newcastle.
General Williams	United Kingdom	The ship was wrecked at Ballywalter, County Down.
George	United Kingdom	The ship was driven ashore at Bangor, County Down.
Harvest Queen	United States	The barque foundered off the Old Head of Kinsale, County Cork, United Kingdom with the loss of all but one of her crew. The survivor was rescued by Henry (United Kingdom). Harvest Queen was on a voyage from Swansea, Glamorgan to Baltimore, Maryland.
Heiress	United Kingdom	The schooner was attended by the Penzance Lifeboat Richard Lewis ( Royal National Lifeboat Institution). Richard Lewis was launched twice at Long Rock, Mount's Bay, and saved 30 men from four different shipwrecks on this date, including six from Heiress.
Hopewell	United Kingdom	The smack was driven ashore and wrecked near Port Madoc. Her crew were rescued. She was on a voyage from Liverpool, Lancashire to Barmouth, Merionethshire.
Humility	United Kingdom	The schooner was driven ashore and damaged at Weymouth, Dorset.
Isabella	United Kingdom	The schooner was driven ashore and wrecked in St. Patrick's Bay. Her crew survived. She was on a voyage from Strangford, County Antrim to Waterford.
James Crossfield	United Kingdom	The clipper foundered off Langness Point, Isle of Man with the loss of all hands, about 40 lives. She was on a voyage from Calcutta, India to Liverpool.
Jean Frederic	United Kingdom	The ship was wrecked on Little Saltee, County Wexford, United Kingdom.
Julia	United Kingdom	The brigantine was driven ashore and wrecked at Exmouth, Devon with the loss of six of her seven crew. She was on a voyage from South Shields, County Durham to Exeter, Devon.
Killiburg	United Kingdom	The ship was driven ashore at Millisle.
Leine Cobb	United Kingdom	The ship was driven ashore at Millisle.
Lucerne	United Kingdom	The brig was driven ashore and wrecked at South Shields. Her eight crew were rescued by rocket apparatus. She was on a voyage from the Humber to South Shields.
Maid of Irvine	United Kingdom	The ship was driven ashore at Ballywalter. She was on a voyage from Paisley, Renfrewshire to Dublin. She was refloated and resumed her voyage.
Margaret	United Kingdom	The schooner foundered off The Lizard, Cornwall with the loss of all four crew.
Marshall	United Kingdom	The schooner was driven ashore and damaged at Weymouth.
Martha	United Kingdom	The smack was driven ashore and wrecked east of Saundersfoot. Her crew were rescued. She was on a voyage from Newport to Milford Haven, Pembrokeshire.
Mary Mack	United Kingdom	The brig was driven ashore and wrecked at South Shields. Her crew were rescued by rocket apparatus.
Mary Margee	United Kingdom	The schooner was driven ashore and wrecked at South Shields with the loss of a crew member. Survivors were rescued by rocket apparatus.
Messenger	United Kingdom	The ship ran aground in the Menai Strait and was scuttled. She was on a voyage from Port Penrhyn, Caernarfonshire to Liverpool.
Monmouth	United Kingdom	The full-rigged ship foundered in the Atlantic Ocean with the loss of eight of her twenty crew. Survivors were rescued on 20 January by the full-rigged ship David Cannon (United Kingdom). Monmouth was on a voyage from New Orleans, Louisiana, United States to Liverpool.
Nesworthy	United Kingdom	The ship was driven ashore at Middleton, County Durham. Her crew were rescued. she was on a voyage from Torquay, Devon to Middlesbrough, Yorkshire.
Olga	Italy	The brig ran aground on the Foreness Rock, Kent, United Kingdom. Her crew survived. She was on a voyage from Newcastle upon Tyne, Northumberland, United Kingdom to Naples.
Oliver Lloyd	United Kingdom	While on a voyage from Liverpool to Cardigan, the sloop was driven out of Cardigan in a gale. Her three crew were rescued by the Cardigan Lifeboat John Stuart Royal National Lifeboat Institution). Oliver Lloyd was later taken in to Cardigan.
Rover	United Kingdom	The sloop was wrecked at Barfleur, Manche, France with the loss of all but her captain. She was on a voyage from Havre de Grâce, Seine-Inférieure, France to an English port.
Salerne	Portugal	The ship was driven ashore and damaged in Mount's Bay. She had become a wreck by 10 January.
Salome	United Kingdom	The schooner was driven ashore in Mount's Bay. She was attended by the Penzance Lifeboat Richard Lewis ( Royal National Lifeboat Institution). Richard Lewis was launched twice at Long Rock, Mount's Bay, Cornwall, and saved 30 men from four different shipwrecks on this date, including six from Salome, which was on a voyage from Port Talbot, Glamorgan to Dartmouth, Devon. She had become a wreck by 10 January.
Search	United Kingdom	The schooner was abandoned in Ramsey Sound. She was taken in to Fishguard, Pembrokeshire on 8 January.
Scotland	United Kingdom	The ship was wrecked at Thisted, Denmark with the loss of all but one of her crew.
Selina Ann	United Kingdom	Five men from the Looe brigantine were saved by the Penzance Lifeboat Richard Lewis ( Royal National Lifeboat Institution) in Mount's Bay. Richard Lewis was launched twice and saved 30 men from four different shipwrecks on this date.
Shamrock	United Kingdom	The smack was abandoned off Wicklow. Her three crew were rescued by the Arklow Lifeboat R. T. Garden ( Royal National Lifeboat Institution).
Snowdon Lassie	United Kingdom	The schooner was driven ashore near Ramsey, Isle of Man. She was on a voyage from "Barlochan" to Liverpool. She was refloated on 8 January and taken in to Ramsey.
St. George	United Kingdom	The schooner foundered off Great Orme Head, Caernarfonshire with the loss of two of her crew. She was on a voyage from Penmaenmawr, Caernarfonshire to Runcorn, Cheshire.
Tiger	United Kingdom	The steamship departed from Bayonne, Basses-Pyrénées, France for Liverpool. No further trace, presumed foundered with the loss of all hands.
Turtle Dove	United Kingdom	The smack was driven out of Cardigan in a gale. Her three crew were rescued by the Cardigan Lifeboat John Stuart ( Royal National Lifeboat Institution). She was on a voyage from Liverpool to Cardigan. Turtle Dove was later taken in to Cardigan.
Venice	United Kingdom	The ship was driven ashore at Millisle.
Vesper	United Kingdom	The collier, a schooner, was driven into the schooner Earl of Devon and was scuttled at Penzance.

== 6 January ==
List of shipwrecks: 6 January 1867
Ship	State	Description
Ark, and Sarah	United Kingdom	The barque Ark collided with the brig Sarah Great Yarmouth, Norfolk and was abandoned. Her crew were rescued by Sarah, which consequently foundered with the loss of all eighteen people on board. Ark was subsequently driven ashore at Gorleston, Suffolk.
Arrow	United Kingdom	The ship was driven ashore and severely damaged at São Miguel Island, Azores.
Assecuradeur	Hamburg	The ship was driven ashore near Cuxhaven. She was on a voyage from Hamburg to an English port. She was refloated on 10 January with the assistance of a steamship but consequently sank. Her crew were rescued.
Aurora Borealis	Denmark	The barque ran aground on the Goodwin Sands, Kent, United Kingdom. Her ten crew were rescued by the Ramsgate Lifeboat Bradford ( Royal National Lifeboat Institution). Aurora Borealis was on a voyage from Newcastle upon Tyne, Northumberland, United Kingdom to Messina, Sicily, Italy.
Bethesda	United Kingdom	The schooner ran aground on the Cross Sand, in the North Sea off the coast of Norfolk and sank. Her crew survived. She was on a voyage from Bruges, West Flanders, Belgium to Leith, Lothian.
Bristol Packet	United Kingdom	The smack was abandoned at sea. Her crew were rescued. She was on a voyage from Milford Haven, Pembrokeshire to Leith.
Cherub, and Ebbw Vale	United Kingdom	The schooner Ebbw Vale was run into by the schooner Cherub and was abandoned off Mullion, Cornwall. Her crew were rescued by the smack Hearty ( (United Kingdom of Great Britain and Ireland) Jersey). Ebbw Vale was on a voyage from Liverpool, Lancashire to Caen, Calvados, France. Cherub was on a voyage from Cardiff, Glamorgan to Caen. She was consequently beached at Mullion with the loss of all hands.
Clara Louise	United Kingdom	The ship was driven ashore at the Mumbles, Glamorgan. She was refloated and taken in to Swansea, Glamorgan in a severely leaky condition.
Colibri	France	The lugger was abandoned in the English Channel 25 nautical miles (46 km) north of Cherbourg, Seine-Inférieure. Her crew were rescued. She was on a voyage from Havre de Grâce, Seine-Inférieure to Morlaix, Finistère.
Complete	United Kingdom	The smack was wrecked near Anstruther, Fife.
Confidence	United Kingdom	The schooner was driven ashore east of Breaksea Point, Glamorgan. She was on a voyage from Newport, Monmouthshire to Aberthaw, Glamorgan.
Cora	United Kingdom	The ship was driven ashore and wrecked at South Shields, County Durham. Her crew were rescued by rocket apparatus.
Courrier	France	The collier, a lugger, was wrecked off Dymchurch, Kent, United Kingdom, in a gale and heavy sea with the loss of three of her four crew. The Reverend Charles Cobb rescued the survivor by wading into the surf. She was on a voyage from Dunkirk, Nord to Dieppe, Seine-Inférieure.
Dryad	United Kingdom	The ship was driven ashore 8 nautical miles (15 km) north of Ramsey, Isle of Man. She was on a voyage from Silloth, Cumberland to Newry, County Antrim.
Eliza Jenkins	United Kingdom	The ship was holed by ice and sank at Cuxhaven. Her crew were rescued. She was on a voyage from Hamburg to Liverpool.
Emmanuel Boucher	United Kingdom	The brig was driven ashore at Tynemouth, Northumberland. Six of her crew were rescued by the Tynemouth Lifeboat Pontefract and Goole ( Royal National Lifeboat Institution). Her captain refused to leave the vessel. She was on a voyage from North Shields, Northumberland to London. She was refloated and taken in to North Shields.
Emerald Isle	United Kingdom	The brig was driven ashore at Penzance, Cornwall. Her crew were rescued by the St Michael's Mount Lifeboat.
Emily Constance	United Kingdom	The schooner was driven into the River Douglas, Isle of Man and damaged.
Enterprise	United Kingdom	The ship was driven ashore near Falmouth, Cornwall. She was on a voyage from Teignmouth, Devon to Runcorn, Cheshire. She was refloated.
Falcon	United Kingdom	The steamship ran ashore and was wrecked on the Mull of Kintyre, Argyllshire. She floated off and foundered with the loss of between 40 and 57 lives. There were three survivors. She was on a voyage from Glasgow, Renfrewshire to Londonderry.
F. H. Fyhead	(United Kingdom of Great Britain and Ireland) British North America	The schooner was abandoned in Ballyteague Bay. Her crew were rescued. She was on a voyage from Prince Edward Island to Liverpool.
Free	United Kingdom	The brig was driven ashore and damaged at Milford Haven. She was refloated.
Freedom	United Kingdom	The ship was driven ashore in Studland Bay. She was refloated then ext day and taken in to Poole, Dorset.
Garland	United Kingdom	The schooner sprang a leak and sank in the English Channel 6 nautical miles (11 km) east by south of Dungeness, Kent. Her ten crew survived. She was on a voyage from Sunderland, County Durham to Saint-Valery-sur-Somme, Somme, France.
Harmony	United Kingdom	The schooner was driven ashore at the Mumbles.
Harriet	United Kingdom	The ship was wrecked at "Torre Renaldo", 20 nautical miles (37 km) from Brindisi, Italy. Her crew were rescued. She was on a voyage from Bari, Italy to London.
Harry Smith	United Kingdom	The ship was driven ashore 7 nautical miles (13 km) north of Ramsey. She was on a voyage from Workington, Cumberland to Downpatrick, County Down.
Hector	United Kingdom	The ship was driven ashore in Studland Bay. She was refloated on 11 January and towed in to Poole in a severely leaky condition.
Heroine	United Kingdom	The ship was wrecked at São Miguel Island.
Isabella	United Kingdom	The brig was driven ashore on Læsø, Denmark with the loss of two of her seven crew. She was on a voyage from Riga, Russia to Leith.
James Chadwick	United Kingdom	The schooner was driven ashore and wrecked near St. Andrews, Fife. Her crew were rescued. Her crew survived. She was on a voyage from Montrose, Forfarshire to Seaham, County Durham.
James Crossfield	United Kingdom	The ship was driven ashore and wrecked at Castletown, Isle of Man with the loss of all hands. She was on a voyage from Calcutta, India to Liverpool.
Jane Hughes	United Kingdom	The ship was wrecked near Worms Head, Glamorgan. Her crew were rescued. She was on a voyage from Whitehaven, Cumberland to Cardiff, Glamorgan.
Jeune Isigny	France	The sloop was driven ashore and wrecked at Dungeness with the loss of a crew member. She was on a voyage from Dunkirk to Caen.
Josephine	France	The schooner was driven ashore at the Mumbles. She was on a voyage from Swansea to Caen, Calvados. She was refloated and taken in to Swansea.
Kingston	(United Kingdom of Great Britain and Ireland) British North America	The ship was abandoned in the Irish Sea 30 nautical miles (56 km) south east of Ballycotton, County Cork. Her 23 crew were rescued by the schooner Anne (United Kingdom). Kingston was on a voyage from Liverpool to Calcutta, India. She was subsequently driven ashore and wrecked at Tacumshane, County Wexford.
Lady Emma	United Kingdom	The schooner was driven ashore at the Mumbles. She was on a voyage from Barnstaple, Devon to Swansea. She was refloated and taken in to Swansea.
Marquis of Lorne	United Kingdom	The schooner foundered off the Tuskar Rock. Two crew were rescued by Panama (United Kingdom).
Mary, or Nancy	United Kingdom	The sloop struck the pier at Bognor, Sussex and was severely damaged. Her crew were rescued. She was on a voyage from Sunderland to Bognor.
Mary Poult	United Kingdom	The ship was wrecked near Drogheda, County Louth.
Melona	(United Kingdom of Great Britain and Ireland) Guernsey	The ship was driven ashore in Studland Bay. She was refloated the next day and taken in to Poole.
Nouveau Pacifique	France	The brigantine was driven ashore and wrecked at Ballyteague, County Kildare, United Kingdom with the loss of one of her six crew. She was on a voyage from Santander, Spain to Liverpool.
Noah	United Kingdom	The smack sank in the Irish Sea off the Blackwater Lightship ( Trinity House). Her five crew were rescued by a lifeboat. She was on a voyage from Caernarfon to Milford Haven.
Palermo	United Kingdom	The steamship foundered 65 nautical miles (120 km) south west of the Old Head of Kinsale, County Cork. Her crew were rescued by the schooner Lamberta (France). Palermo was on a voyage from Glasgow to Lisbon, Portugal.
Pegasus	Prussia	The schooner was holed by ice and sank at Freiburg with the loss of three of her five crew. Survivors were rescued by the steamship Amsterdam (Netherlands). Pegasus was on a voyage from the Elbe to Great Yarmouth.
Phœnix	United Kingdom	The schooner was driven ashore on Drakes Island, Devon. She was refloated with assistance from the tug Secret (United Kingdom) and towed in to Batten Bay.
Princess Royal	United Kingdom	The steamship ran aground on the Pagensand, in the North Sea. She was on a voyage from Hamburg to London.
Queen of the Fleet	United Kingdom	The ship was wrecked at São Miguel Island.
Santa Isabella	Portugal	The ship was severely damaged at São Miguel Island.
Spring	United Kingdom	The brig ran aground at Sunderland. She was on a voyage from Cork to Sunderland. She was refloated and taken in to Sunderland.
Towey	United Kingdom	The barque was driven ashore and wrecked at Dymchurch. All nine people on board were rescued. She was on a voyage from Dunkirk to Cardiff.
Triumph	United Kingdom	The schooner collided with the brigantine Reaper (United Kingdom) and sank at Milford Haven. Triumph was on a voyage from Barrow-in-Furness, Lancashire to Caernarfon.
Two Brothers	United Kingdom	The sloop foundered off Kingstown, County Dublin. Her crew were rescued. She was on a voyage from Bangor, Caernarfonshire to Bristol, Gloucestershire.
Undine	United Kingdom	The brigantine was driven ashore at Wexford with the loss of four of her six crew. She was on a voyage from Newport, Monmouthshire to Wexford.
Voluneer	United Kingdom	The ship was driven ashore in Studland Bay. She was refloated.
William Butcher	United Kingdom	The brig ran aground on the Herd Sand, in the North Sea off the coast of County Durham. Her crew were rescued. She was refloated with the assistance of a tug and taken in to South Shields in a severely leaky condition.
Zuetta	United Kingdom	The ship was driven ashore in Studland Bay. She was refloated the next day and taken in to Poole.
Unnamed	France	The brigantine was driven ashore at Bray, County Wicklow, United Kingdom. Her crew were rescued.
Unnamed	Flag unknown	The ship was wrecked on a rock off Great Saltee, County Wexford.
Unnamed	United Kingdom	The sloop was wrecked at Anstruther, Fife. Her three crew survived.
Unnamed	France	The schooner was driven ashore and wrecked in Tramore Bay. Her crew were rescued by the Wexford Lifeboat. She was on a voyage from Glasgow to Nantes, Loire-Inférieure.
Unnamed	Flag unknown	The steamship ran aground on the Pagensand.

== 7 January ==
List of shipwrecks: 7 January 1867
Ship	State	Description
Amoor	Hamburg	The ship sank at Cuxhaven. She was on a voyage from Hamburg to Bahia, Brazil.
Anenome	France	The schooner was driven ashore and wrecked at Tramore, County Waterford, United kingdom. Her five crew were rescued by the Tramore Lifeboat Tom Egan ( Royal National Lifeboat Institution).
Brighton	United Kingdom	The ship was driven ashore at Milford Haven, Pembrokeshire. She was refloated.
Brothers	United Kingdom	The schooner was driven ashore and wrecked at Beaumaris, Anglesey.
Capella	United Kingdom	The ship was driven ashore at Duncanny Point, County Louth.
Christian	United Kingdom	The ship was wrecked at "Tistlarn", Sweden with the loss of three of her crew. She was on a voyage from Cardiff, Glamorgan to Copenhagen, Denmark.
Clara	United Kingdom	The ship was driven ashore at Hakin Point, Pembrokeshire. She was refloated but found to be severely leaky.
Cleverlloyd	United Kingdom	The sloop was driven out to sea from Cardigan. Her crew were taken off by the Cardigan Lifeboat.
County of Renfrew	United Kingdom	The ship was driven ashore and wrecked at Tacumshane, County Wexford with the loss of three of her eighteen crew. She was on a voyage from Rotterdam, South Holland, Netherlands to Glasgow, Renfrewshire.
Cousins	United Kingdom	The ship was driven ashore and damaged at Beaumaris.
Despatch	United Kingdom	The schooner was driven ashore at Middleton County Durham. Her crew were rescued. She was refloated and taken in to Hartlepool, County Durham.
Dimorlan	United Kingdom	The ship was driven ashore in the Weser.
Eleanor	United Kingdom	The ship sprang a leak and was beached at West Hartlepool.
Ella	(United Kingdom of Great Britain and Ireland) British North America	The brig was abandoned north west of Ailsa Craig, Ayrshire with the loss of a crew member. She came ashore at Carradale. Argyllshire and was wrecked.
Favourite	United Kingdom	The ship was driven ashore at Milford Haven. She was on a voyage from Cardiff to Kingstown, County Dublin. She was refloated.
Francis	United Kingdom	The ship was wrecked in Ramsey Sound, Pembrokeshire.
Helen	(United Kingdom of Great Britain and Ireland) British North America	The brigantine foundered off the coast of Argyllshire.
Iowa	United Kingdom	The ship was driven ashore at "Bychurch". She was on a voyage from Dunkirk, Nord, France to Cardiff.
Ivanhoe	United States	The ship was driven on to a sandbank at Falmouth. She was on a voyage from London, United Kingdom to San Francisco, California.
James Shadwick	United Kingdom	The schooner was driven ashore and wrecked near Saint Andrews, Fife. Her six crew survived. She was on a voyage from Montrose, Forfarshire to Seaham, County Durham.
Jane	United Kingdom	The schooner was driven ashore at Swansea, Glamorgan. She was on a voyage from Bridgwater, Somerset to Swansea.
Jane Tudor	United Kingdom	The barque was driven ashore and wrecked at the mouth of the Ebro. She was on a voyage from Barcelona to Burriana, Spain.
King of Tyre	United Kingdom	The schooner was holed by ice and sank at Bremerhaven. Her crew were rescued. She was on a voyage from Brake, Prussia to Newcastle upon Tyne, Northumberland.
Kulleroo	(Russian Empire) Grand Duchy of Finland	The brigantine was abandoned off Domesnes, Norway. Her crew were rescued by Scotscraig (United Kingdom). Kulleroo was on a voyage from Christiania, Norway to Newcastle upon Tyne, Northumberland, United Kingdom. She was taken in to South Shields, County Durham by the smack Tantivy (United Kingdom) on 24 January.
Lady Bulkeley	United Kingdom	The ship was driven ashore at Beaumaris.
Mary	United Kingdom	The schooner was driven ashore and wrecked at Downend, Devon.
Mary Anne	United Kingdom	The ship was driven ashore at Larne, County Antrim.
Mary Wae	United Kingdom	The ship was driven ashore and wrecked at South Shields.
Messenger	United Kingdom	The ship was driven ashore and damaged at Beaumaris.
Neanthes	United Kingdom	The brigantine was abandoned off Sanda Island with the loss of one of her eight crew. She was on a voyage from Ardrossan, Ayrshire to Livorno, Italy. Neanthes was towed in to Greenock, Renfrewshire by the steamship Garland (United Kingdom).
Nellist	United Kingdom	The ship ran aground off Huttoft, Lincolnshire. She was on a voyage from Dieppe, Seine-Inférieure, France to Whitby, Yorkshire. She was refloated the next day.
Ocean	United Kingdom	The ship sank at Harwich, Essex.
Palmyra	United Kingdom	The schooner was wrecked in Batten Bay with the loss of all hands.
Pennon	United Kingdom	The ship was driven ashore at Beaumaris.
Rock Scorpion	United Kingdom	The schooner was driven ashore at Lowestoft, Suffolk. Her crew were rescued.
Roseberry	United Kingdom	The brig was driven ashore at Lowestoft. Her crew were rescued. She was on a voyage from the Nieuw Diep to Sunderland, County Durham.
Seraphim	France	The brigantine was wrecked near Kidwelly, Carmarthenshire, United Kingdom. Her eight crew were rescued by the Llanelly Lifeboat City of Bath ( Royal National Lifeboat Institution).
St. Francis	(United Kingdom of Great Britain and Ireland) Gibraltar	The brig was run ashore in Clonakilty Bay. She was on a voyage from Gibraltar to Swansea.
St. Helena	Flag unknown	The ship was driven ashore and wrecked at Gully Head, County Cork.
Stockton	United Kingdom	The schooner was wrecked at Deal, Kent.
Teazer	United Kingdom	The schooner was driven ashore in Batten Bay with the loss of two of her three crew. Her mate was rescued by the Plymouth Lifeboat.
Turtle Dove	United Kingdom	The smack was driven out to sea from Cardigan. Her crew were taken off by the Cardigan Lifeboat.
Two Brothers	United Kingdom	The schooner was wrecked on the New Gate Sands, off the coast of Pembrokeshire. Her four crew were rescued. She was on a voyage from Holyhead, Anglesey to London.
Virgilia	(United Kingdom of Great Britain and Ireland) Jersey	The barque was driven ashore near Millbrook.
Yeoman's Glory	United Kingdom	The schooner was driven ashore and wrecked at Laugharne, Carmarthenshire. Her crew were rescued. She was on a voyage from Bideford, Devon to Newport, Monmouthshire.
Unnamed	Italy	The brig was driven ashore at Ravenhill, Wigtownshire. She was on a voyage from Odesa, Russia to Londonderry. She was refloated the next day but consequently sank.

== 8 January ==
List of shipwrecks: 8 January 1867
Ship	State	Description
Adeline	United Kingdom	The ship was destroyed by an explosion at Shanghai, China with the loss of four of her crew.
Algau	Italy	The brig was wrecked on the Foreness Rock, Margate, Kent, United Kingdom. Some of her crew were rescued by the Margate Lifeboat Friend to all Nations ( Royal National Lifeboat Institution), others waded ashore. Algau was on a voyage from Newcastle upon Tyne, Northumberland, United Kingdom to Naples.
Ann & Emily	United Kingdom	The schooner was driven ashore and wrecked at Lyme, Dorset.
Antares	Greifswald	The brig was driven onto the Hood Sand, in the English Channel off Poole, Dorset, United Kingdom. A crew member was rescued by the Poole Lifeboat. She was on a voyage from Greifswald to Portsmouth, Hampshire, United Kingdom. Antares was refloated on 22 January and towed in to Portsmouth in a severely leaky condition
Bethesda	United Kingdom	The ship was wrecked on the Cross Sand, in the North Sea off the coast of Norfolk. Her crew were rescued by a smack. She was on a voyage from Bruges, West Flanders, Belgium to Leith, Lothian.
Celestine Marie	France	The schooner was driven ashore and wrecked in Mill Bay, Pembrokeshire, United Kingdom. Her crew were rescued. She was on a voyage from Ardrossan, Ayrshire to Nantes, Loire-Inférieure.
Coronation	United Kingdom	The smack was lost off Cardigan. Her four crew were rescued by the Cardigan Lifeboat John Stuart ( Royal National Lifeboat Institution). She was on a voyage from Runcorn, Cheshire to Plymouth, Devon.
Derry Jane	United Kingdom	The schooner was driven ashore in the Cattewater. She was on a voyage from Cork to Southampton, Hampshire. She was refloated with assistance from the tug Secret (United Kingdom) and towed in to Sutton Harbour, Devon in a waterlogged condition.
Eltham	United Kingdom	The brig was run down and sunk by a steamship 15 nautical miles (28 km) west of the Newarp Lightship ( Trinity House). Her crew were rescued by the schooner Marie Aline (France). Eltham was on a voyage from Ostend, West Flanders, Belgium to Sunderland, County Durham.
Espoir	France	The lugger foundered in the Bristol Channel. Her six crew were rescued by the Llanelly Lifeboat City of Bath ( Royal National Lifeboat Institution). Espir was on a voyage from Swansea, Glamorgan, United Kingdom to Nantes, Loire-Inférieure. She came ashore at Llanmadoc, Glamorgan and was wrecked.
F. S. Lidyard	(United Kingdom of Great Britain and Ireland) British North America	The ship was driven ashore and wrecked on Banna Strand, County Kerry. She was on a voyage from New London, Prince Edward Island to Liverpool, Lancashire.
Gem	United Kingdom	The schooner was driven ashore and wrecked at Cefn Sidan, Carmarthenshire with the loss of four of her six crew. Survivors were rescued by the Ferryside Lifeboat City of Manchester ( Royal National Lifeboat Institution). Gem was on a voyage from Greenock, Renfrewshire to Southampton, Hampshire.
Gem	United Kingdom	The schooner capsized off the coast of Pembrokeshire with the loss of her captain.
Jane Almond	United Kingdom	The ship was driven ashore at Dieppe, Seine-Infėrieure, France. She was on a voyage from Cardiff, Glamorgan to Dieppe. She was refloated and towed in to Dieppe in a leaky condition.
Jeune Celestine	France	The schooner was driven ashore and wrecked in the Isles of Scilly, United Kingdom. She was on a voyage from Swansea to Nantes.
Johanna	Hamburg	The schooner was driven ashore and wrecked at Chale, Isle of Wight, United Kingdom with the loss of three of her crew. She was on a voyage from Grimsby, Lincolnshire, United Kingdom to Saint Domingo.
John Francis Buller	United Kingdom	The ship ran aground off Great Yarmouth, Norfolk and was damaged. She was on a voyage from Ipswich, Suffolk to Peterhead, Aberdeenshire.
John Gray	United Kingdom	The barque was driven ashore at Marazion, Cornwall with the loss of four of the nineteen people on board. Survivors were rescued by the Penzance Lifeboat Richard Lewis ( Royal National Lifeboat Institution). She was on a voyage from Demerara, British Guiana to London.
Maren	France	The ship was driven ashore and sank on Amack, Denmark. She was on a voyage from Rostock to London, United Kingdom.
Mute	United Kingdom	The schooner was run into by the brigantine Ellen Lucy (United Kingdom) and sank at Harwich, Essex. Her crew were rescued.
Nouvelle Eugenie	France	The schooner was driven ashore at Broadhaven, Pembrokeshire, United Kingdom. Her crew were rescued. She was on a voyage from Ardrossan, Ayrshire, United Kingdom to Nantes, Loire-Inférieure.
Panda	United Kingdom	The schooner was driven ashore and wrecked at Lyme.
Spec	United Kingdom	The brigantine was driven ashore and wrecked at Lyme.
Test	United Kingdom	The ship was run into by another vessel and was holed in the River Wear. She was consequently beached.
Tiger	United Kingdom	The steamship was heading for Liverpool, Lancashire from Bayonne, Basses-Pyrénées with an unspecified cargo when she foundered off either the Brisons or Pendeen, Cornwall in a force 9 north west gale. All fourteen on board lost their lives. The ship's boat was found at Porthchapel and Joseph Bawden of Phillack was committed at Camborne Petty Sessions to two months hard labour for concealment of staves, the property of Her Majesty's Customs.
True Blue	United Kingdom	The ship was wrecked at Cuxhaven.
Vulcan	United Kingdom	The schooner was driven ashore and wrecked at Lyme. Her three crew were rescued by the Coastguard.
Zenith	United Kingdom	The brig foundered in the Bristol Channel off Burry Holms with the loss of all hands.

== 9 January ==
List of shipwrecks: 9 January 1867
Ship	State	Description
Caledonia	United Kingdom	The brig ran aground at Oban, Argyllshire. She was on a voyage from Riga, Russia to Belfast, County Antrim.
Francis	United Kingdom	The schooner sank off New Ferry Cheshire.
John and Mary	United Kingdom	The schooner was driven ashore and wrecked at North Berwick, Lothian. Both crew were rescued.
Lady Churchill	United Kingdom	The smack collided with another smack and sank off Great Yarmouth, Norfolk. Her crew were rescued.
Mary-Ann	United Kingdom	The brig was driven ashore and wrecked in Loch Grumart. Her crew survived. She was on a voyage from South Shields, County Durham to Dublin.
Obi	United Kingdom	The schooner collided with the steamship Chrysolite (United Kingdom) and sank in Liverpool Bay. She was on a voyage from Runcorn, Cheshire to Barrow-in-Furness, Lancashire and/or Whitehaven, Cumberland.
Orden	Norway	The barque was driven onto the Parson and Clerk Rocks, on the coast of Devon, United Kingdom. She was refloated and taken in to Teignmouth, Devon.
Taymouth Castle	United Kingdom	The full-rigged ship was driven ashore and wrecked Torr Head, County Antrim with the loss of all hands. She was on a voyage from the Clyde to Singapore, Straits Settlements.
Tom and Mary	(United Kingdom of Great Britain and Ireland) Jersey	The ship was driven ashore and wrecked at Lossiemouth, Moray. She was on a voyage from Seville, Spain to Leith, Lothian.
Victorine	France	The ship was driven ashore near "Caleret", Seine-Inférieure. She was on a voyage from Swansea, Glamorgan, United Kingdom to Nantes, Loire-Inférieure.
Unnamed	France	The schooner was driven ashore at Llanmadoc, Glamorgan. Her crew were rescued.
Unnamed	Flag unknown	The brig was wrecked at Llanmadoc with the loss of all hands.

== 10 January ==
List of shipwrecks: 10 January 1867
Ship	State	Description
Archer	United Kingdom	The schooner ran aground at West Hartlepool, County Durham. She was on a voyage from Dundee, Forfarshire to South Shields, County Durham. She was refloated with assistance from the tug Thomas & Mary (United Kingdom) and taken in to West Hartlepool.
Camelia	United Kingdom	The brig was driven ashore "Saint Michael Island". Her crew were rescued. She was on a voyage from Cardiff, Glamorgan to Bordeaux, Gironde.
Egbertus	Netherlands	The schooner was driven ashore between East Wemyss and West Wemyss, Fife, United Kingdom. All six people on board were rescued.
Enchantress	United Kingdom	The barque foundered in the Atlantic Ocean 60 nautical miles (110 km) south west of Land's End, Cornwall. Her fourteen crew were rescued by the barque William Ludvig (Norway). Enchantress was on a voyage from Odesa, Russia to Falmouth, Cornwall.
Hero	United Kingdom	The schooner foundered off Souter Point, Northumberland. Her four crew were rescued by the tug Renown (United Kingdom). Hero was on a voyage from Blyth, Northumberland to Dundee, Forfarshire.
Langurthowe	United Kingdom	The schooner was driven ashore at Par, Cornwall.
Marquis of Bute	United Kingdom	The barque was driven ashore and wrecked at Alexandria, Egypt. She was on a voyage from Alexandria to an English port.
Mary Elizabeth	(United Kingdom of Great Britain and Ireland) British North America	The ship was abandoned off the Hook Lighthouse, County Wexford. Her crew were rescued by Alikern (United Kingdom). Mary Elizabeth was on a voyage from Swansea, Glamorgan to Livorno, Italy.
Prince Albert	United Kingdom	The barque was abandoned in the Atlantic Ocean. Her crew were rescued by the brig Kong Carl (Norway). Prince Albert was on a voyage from Newcastle upon Tyne, Northumberland to Surinam.
Robert and Betsy	United Kingdom	The schooner was driven ashore and wrecked at West Hartlepool. Her crew were rescued by the Hartlepool Lifeboat. She was on a voyage from South Shields, County Durham to Aberdeen.
St. Francis	United Kingdom	The ship was driven ashore at Cork. She was on a voyage from Swansea to Gibraltar.
Superior	Spain	The schooner was driven ashore and wrecked at Millook, Cornwall, United Kingdom with the loss of eight of her eleven crew. She was on a voyage from Cardiff to Lisbon, Portugal.
Venus	Hamburg	The ship ran aground on the Krant Sand, in the North Sea and sank. She was on a voyage from Hamburg to Gibraltar.

== 11 January ==
List of shipwrecks: 11 January 1867
Ship	State	Description
Ellen Allen	United Kingdom	The ship was driven ashore and wrecked near "Petite Passage". She was on a voyage from Saint John, New Brunswick, British North America to Liverpool, Lancashire.
John Bull	United Kingdom	The paddle tug struck the pier at Hartlepool, County Durham and was consequently beached.
Orizava	France	The ship was wrecked at the mouth of the Gironde. She was on a voyage from New Orleans, Louisiana, United States to Bordeaux, Gironde. She was later refloated and taken in to Auray, Morbihan.
Superior	Sweden	The brig, carrying a cargo of coal from Cardiff, Wales, to London, lost her bearings and canvas off the coast of Cornwall, England, and struck a reef at Millook. Nine of the 15 aboard lost their lives, including the captain.
Thomas Humphreys	United States	The barque was driven ashore and wrecked at "Harry Furlong", Anglesey, United Kingdom with the loss of nine of her eleven crew. She was on a voyage from the River Mersey to New York.
William Duke	United Kingdom	The schooner was driven ashore and wrecked near Vigo, Spain. She was on a voyage from Hartlepool, County Durham to Cádiz, Spain.
Zitella	United Kingdom	The barque was abandoned in the Atlantic Ocean off Ouessant, Finistère, France with the loss of her captain. She was on a voyage from South Shields, County Durham to Callao, Peru.

== 12 January ==
List of shipwrecks: 12 January 1867
Ship	State	Description
Admiral	United Kingdom	The ship ran aground at St. Simon's, Georgia, United States. She was on a voyage from Brunswick, Georgia to Liverpool, lancashire.
Atalanta	Bremen	The ship was driven ashore on the "Misen". She was on a voyage from Bremen to New York, United States.
Blayais	France	The brig ran aground in the Minquiers, south of Jersey, Channel Islands. The crew escaped in lifeboats.
Hebron	United Kingdom	The ship sprang a leak and was beached between Ballaugh and Kirk Michael, Isle of Man, where she became a wreck. She was on a voyage from Maryport, Cumberland to Dublin.
Lisbon	United Kingdom	The brig ran aground on the Skullmartin Rock, in the Belfast Lough. She was on a voyage from Liverpool, Lancashire to Málaga, Spain. She was refloated on 14 January and towed in to Belfast, County Antrim.
Robinson	United Kingdom	The ship was driven ashore on Sherbro Island, Sierra Leone.
Scotia	United Kingdom	The steamship ran aground and sank at Hartlepool, County Durham. Her crew were rescued. She was on a voyage from Bo'ness, Lothian to Middlesbrough, Yorkshire.
Snowdown	United Kingdom	The ship was driven ashore at Breaksea Point, Glamorgan. She was on a voyage from Ardrossan, Ayrshire to Newport, Monmouthshire.
Violet	United Kingdom	The schooner was driven ashore at Sunderland, County Durham. Her crew were rescued. She was on a voyage from Dundee, Forfarshire to Sunderland. She was refloated on 24 January.
William Fenwick	United Kingdom	The ship ran aground on the Little Burbo Sandbank, in Liverpool Bay. She was on a voyage from Liverpool to Saint John, New Brunswick, British North America. She was refloated and put back to Liverpool.

== 13 January ==
List of shipwrecks: 13 January 1867
Ship	State	Description
Alma	Sweden	The schooner ran aground on the Longsand, in the North Sea off the coast of Essex, United Kingdom. She was on a voyage from Vaasa, Finland to Marseille, Bouches-du-Rhône, France. She was refloated and taken in to Harwich, Essex in a waterlogged condition.
Clontarf	United Kingdom	The ship was abandoned in the Atlantic Ocean. She was on a voyage from Pensacola, Florida, United States to Queenstown, County Cork.
Edith	United Kingdom	The ship departed from Cape Town, Cape Colony for the Kowie River. No further trace, presumed foundered with the loss of all hands.
Gilbert Greenall	United Kingdom	The ship ran aground on the West Hoyle Sandbank, in Liverpool Bay. She was refloated and taken in to Chester, Cheshire.
Mary	United Kingdom	The brig caught fire at Newry, County Antrim and was scuttled.
Velocity	United Kingdom	The ship caught fire at Jersey, Channel Island with the loss of a crew member and was scuttled. She was on a voyage from Cardiff, Glamorgan to Jersey.

== 14 January ==
List of shipwrecks: 14 January 1867
Ship	State	Description
Laurevania	Haiti	The schooner was abandoned in the Atlantic Ocean. Her crew were rescued by the steamship Atalanta (United Kingdom), which put six of her own crew on board with the intention of taking her in to Boston, Massachusetts or New York, United States. Laurevania was on a voyage from Haiti to New York.
Ossian	United Kingdom	The steamship was driven ashore at Sheelhoek, Zeeland, Netherlands. She was on a voyage from Riga, Russia to Antwerp, Belgium. She was refloated and taken in to Hellevoetsluis, Zeeland.
Violet	United Kingdom	The ship was drive out to sea from São Miguel Island, Azores. No further trace, presumed foundered with the loss of all hands.

== 15 January ==
List of shipwrecks: 15 January 1867
Ship	State	Description
Ann Buckle	United Kingdom	The ship was driven ashore and wrecked at Cape Spartel, Morocco with the loss of seventeen of her 22 crew. She was on a voyage from Newcastle upon Tyne, Northumberland to a Greek port.
Dignus	United Kingdom	The ship was wrecked near "Villa Nova de Mille Fontes", Portugal with the loss of three of her crew. She was on a voyage from Cardiff, Glamorgan to Alexandria, Egypt.
Dolphin	United Kingdom	The smack was wrecked on the Patch Sand, in the North Sea off the coast of Norfolk. Her crew were rescued.
Onward	United Kingdom	The schooner was driven ashore and severely damaged at Corton, Suffolk. Her crew were rescued. She was on a voyage from Ipswich, Suffolk to Newcastle upon Tyne, Northumberland.
Petrel	United Kingdom	The smack was driven ashore at Great Yarmouth, Norfolk. Her crew were rescued by rocket apparatus. She became a wreck the next day.
Prince Albert	(United Kingdom of Great Britain and Ireland) Guernsey	The schooner was driven ashore at Corton. Her crew were rescued by rocket apparatus.
Racer	United Kingdom	The cutter was run into by a Dutch fishing boat and foundered in the North Sea. Her crew were rescued by the Dutch vessel. Her crew were rescued by Pet (United Kingdom).
Sea Wave	United Kingdom	The ship ran aground at Padstow, Cornwall. She was on a voyage from the Clyde to Batavia, Netherlands East Indies. She was refloated.

== 16 January ==
List of shipwrecks: 16 January 1867
Ship	State	Description
Affinity	United Kingdom	The ship caught fire at Plymouth, Devon. She was on a voyage from Dublin to Antwerp, Belgium.
Albertine	Prussia	The brig ran aground in the River Mersey.
Audax	United Kingdom	The ship was damaged in a gale at Naples, Italy.
Ausonia	Greece	The ship was wrecked at Naples.
Blanche	United Kingdom	The barque was driven ashore and damaged at the mouth of the Gualmina, near Marbella, Spain. Her sixteen crew were rescued. She was on a voyage from Odesa, Russia to Falmouth, Cornwall. She was refloated with assistance from the tug Lion de Belge (Flag unknown) and towed in to Gibraltar.
Brilliant	United Kingdom	The brig ran aground at Lowestoft, Suffolk and was run into by Mary (United Kingdom). Brilliant was on a voyage from London to Hartlepool, County Durham. She was refloated.
Carl	United Kingdom	The ship ran aground at the mouth of the Mississippi River. She was on a voyage from New Orleans, Louisiana, United States to Liverpool, Lancashire.
Christopher Columbus	(United Kingdom of Great Britain and Ireland) Jersey	The brig was damaged in a gale at Naples.
Clyde	United Kingdom	The schooner was driven ashore and wrecked at Caister-on-Sea, Norfolk. Her five crew were rescued by the Caister Lifeboat Birmingham No.2 ( Royal National Lifeboat Institution).
Eclipse	United Kingdom	The brig was driven ashore and wrecked at Dieppe, Seine-Inférieure, France with the loss of three of the six people on board. She was on a voyage from London to Saint-Valery-sur-Somme, Somme, France.
Encarnacão	Spain	The ship was abandoned north east of São Miguel Island, Azores. Her crew survived. She was on a voyage from Saint John's, Newfoundland, British North America to Cádiz.
Enos	United Kingdom	The barque was damaged in a gale at Naples.
Evangelistra	United Kingdom	The ship foundered at Naples.
Gondola	United Kingdom	The barque foundered in the Mediterranean Sea 20 nautical miles (37 km) off Cape Spartivento, Sardinia, Italy. Her crew were rescued. She was on a voyage from Odesa, Russia to Falmouth, Cornwall or Queenstown, County Cork.
Howden	United Kingdom	The schooner was damaged in a gale at Naples.
Manx Minx	(United Kingdom of Great Britain and Ireland) Isle of Man	The schooner was damaged in a gale at Naples.
Melledgan	United Kingdom	The schooner was damaged in a gale at Naples.
Tally Ho	United Kingdom	The ship was blown out to sea from São Miguel Island, Azores. No further trace.
Theodor	Prussia	The ship was driven ashore and wrecked at Naples. She was on a voyage from Newcastle upon Tyne, Northumberland, United Kingdom to Naples.
Victory	United Kingdom	The schooner collided with the schooner Ellen (United Kingdom) and was run ashore at Pakefield, Suffolk.
William Shepherd	United Kingdom	The barque was driven ashore at Lowestoft, Suffolk. Her crew were rescued. She was refloated on 21 January and taken in to Lowestoft.
Wonder	United Kingdom	The schooner was damaged in a gale at Naples.
Zebiah	(United Kingdom of Great Britain and Ireland) Jersey	The schooner was damaged in a gale at Naples.
Three unnamed vessels	Greece	The ships were wrecked at Naples.

== 17 January ==
List of shipwrecks: 17 January 1867
Ship	State	Description
Aberdeen	United Kingdom	The ship struck a submerged object in the Savannah River.
Argo	United Kingdom	The schooner was driven ashore and wrecked near Kingsdown, Kent. Her crew were rescued.
Astley	United Kingdom	The brig was driven ashore at Clee Ness, Lincolnshire. She was on a voyage from Great Yarmouth, Norfolk to Seaham, County Durham. She was refloated the next day and taken in to Grimsby, Lincolnshire.
Berbice	United Kingdom	The barque was driven ashore at Gibraltar. She was refloated. She was refloated on 22 January by the tug Hercules (United Kingdom).
Carita	Austrian Empire	The brig was driven ashore south of Cádiz, Spain. Her nine crew were rescued. She was on a voyage from Cardiff, Glamorgan, Ireland to Trieste.
Chowdean	United Kingdom	The barque ran aground off Great Yarmouth. She was on a voyage from South Shields, County Durham to Naples, Italy. Her twelve crew were rescued by the Great Yarmouth Lifeboat. She was refloated and taken in to Lowestoft, Suffolk in a leaky condition.
Christiana, and an unidentified vessel	Denmark; Flag unknown	The barque collided with another vessel off the Sandy Hook Lightship ( United States Lighthouse Board). Both vessels sank. Christiana was on a voyage from Rio de Janeiro, Brazil to Boston, Massachusetts, United States.
Dawn of Day	(United Kingdom of Great Britain and Ireland) British North America	The brig was wrecked at Cohasset, Massachusetts, United States. Her crew were rescued. She was on a voyage from the Turks Islands to Boston, Massachusetts.
Eugenie	United Kingdom	The brig was driven ashore near Gravelines, Nord. Her crew were rescued. She was on a voyage from Newcastle upon Tyne, Northumberland to Topsham, Devon.
Fanny	United Kingdom	The schooner was driven ashore at Gibraltar.
Hannah	United Kingdom	The ship was driven ashore on Ouessant, Finistère, France. Her crew were rescued.
Hannah Andrews	United Kingdom	The ship was driven ashore and wrecked between Cap Blanc Nez and Cap Gris Nez, Pas-de-Calais, France. Her crew were rescued.
Henrich	United Kingdom	The ship was driven ashore at Gibraltar.
Iduna	Sweden	The schooner was driven ashore near Gravelines. Her crew were rescued. she was on a voyage from Hartlepool, County Durham to Genoa, Italy.
Jane	United Kingdom	The brig was driven ashore at Gibraltar. She was consequently condemned.
Jane and Ann	United Kingdom	The schooner was driven ashore near Calais, France. Her crew were rescued. She had become a wreck by 23 January.
Maid of Erin	United Kingdom	The brig was driven ashore near Gravelines. Her crew were rescued. She was on a voyage from Newcastle upon Tyne to Folkestone, Kent.
Maria Louise	Hamburg	The ship ran aground on the Medem Sand, in the North Sea. She was on a voyage from Hamburg to Haiti.
Mobile	Bremen	The ship was destroyed by fire at Mobile, Alabama, United States.
Oak	United Kingdom	The brig was driven ashore at Lowestoft. Her crew were rescued.
Paul	United Kingdom	The brig foundered. Her crew were rescued by Eden L. ( Austrian Empire). Paul was on a voyage from Constantinople, Ottoman Empire to Falmouth, Cornwall.
Platte Valley	United States	The steamship struck the sunken wreck of CSS General M. Jeff Thompson and sank in the Mississippi River near Memphis, Tennessee, while en route to Vicksburg, Mississippi. Initial reporting indicated that there were 60 fatalities.
Radical	United Kingdom	The schooner was driven ashore and wrecked at Hopton-on-Sea, Norfolk. Her crew were rescued by rocket apparatus. She was on a voyage from Seaham, County Durham to Harwich, Essex.
Ravensbury	United Kingdom	The steamship ran aground at Brielle, South Holland, Netherlands. She was on a voyage from Rotterdam, South Holland to Harwich, Essex. She was refloated and put back to Rotterdam in a leaky condition.
Rosalie	United Kingdom	The brig was driven ashore at Gibraltar. She was on a voyage from Palermo, Sicily, Italy to Baltimore. She was refloated on 22 January by the tug Lion Belge (Flag unknown).
Shooting Star	United Kingdom	The brig was abandoned at sea. She was on a voyage from New York, United States to Aspinwall, United States of Colombia.
Sweden	United Kingdom	The hulk was driven ashore at Gibraltar.
Themis, and Zephyr	Bremen (United Kingdom of Great Britain and Ireland) Hong Kong	The schooner Themis and the powder hulk Zephyr were destroyed by an explosion at Hong Kong with loss of life.
Tudor	United Kingdom	The ship departed from Liverpool, Lancashire for Bombay, India. Presumed foundered with the loss of all hands; a lifebuoy from the ship came ashore at St. Agnes, Isles of Scilly on 8 February.
Thomas	United Kingdom	The schooner was driven ashore at Kirtley, Suffolk. She was on a voyage from Plymouth, Devon to Lowestoft.
Trois Sœurs	France	The ship was wrecked at Calais with the loss of all but one of her crew. She was on a voyage from Rotterdam to Saint-Nazaire, Loire-Inférieure.
Twenty-ninth of May	United Kingdom	The brig was driven ashore and wrecked at Calais with the loss of all hands. She was on a voyage from South Shields, County Durham to Havre de Grâce, Seine-Inférieure, France.
Vilma	United States	The barque was driven ashore and wrecked near Plymouth, Massachusetts with the loss of a crew member. Survivors were rescued by a lifeboat. She was on a voyage from Smyrna, Ottoman Empire to Boston, Massachusetts.
Zouave	France	The barque was driven ashore at Gibraltar. She was on a voyage from Oran, Algeria to Queenstown, County Cork, United Kingdom. She was refloated. She was refloated on 22 January by the tug Lion Belge (Flag unknown).
Unnamed lifeboat	United Kingdom	A Royal Humane Society lifeboat capsized when it went to the aid of the three-masted vessel Trois Sœurs (France) which had gone ashore at the back of Calais pier. Five members of the English volunteer lifeboat crew drowned.

== 18 January ==
List of shipwrecks: 18 January 1867
Ship	State	Description
Cortes	United Kingdom	The steamship was driven ashore near Huelva, Spain and severely damaged. She was on a voyage from Málaga to Cádiz, Spain. She was later refloated.
George	United Kingdom	The brig ran aground at Bridlington, Yorkshire.

== 19 January ==
List of shipwrecks: 19 January 1867
Ship	State	Description
Aquila	United Kingdom	The ship was abandoned in the Atlantic Ocean. Her crew were rescued by Queen Victoria (United Kingdom). Aquila was on a voyage from Greenock, Renfrewshire to New York, United States.
Catherine and Hermann	Denmark	The schooner sank in the North Sea off Texel, North Holland, Netherlands. Her crew were rescued. She was on a voyage from Newcastle upon Tyne, Northumberland, United Kingdom to the West Indies.
Favourite	United Kingdom	The barque ran aground on the Woolpack Sand, in The Wash and was wrecked. She was on a voyage from Danzig to London.
Glengall	(United Kingdom of Great Britain and Ireland) British North America	The ship was abandoned in the Atlantic Ocean. Her crew were rescued. She was on a voyage from London to Boston, Massachusetts, United States.
Isabella	United Kingdom	The schooner was driven ashore and broke her back at Weymouth, Dorset. Her crew were rescued. She was on a voyage from Cardiff, Glamorgan to Portsmouth, Hampshire.
Julia	United Kingdom	The barque was abandoned in the Atlantic Ocean. Her crew were rescued by Fleetwing (United Kingdom). Julia was on a voyage from Saint John, New Brunswick, British North America to Liverpool, Lancashire.
Leitão Cuñha	Brazil	The paddle steamer broke in two and foundered in the Atlantic Ocean approximately 50 miles (80 km) off the Isles of Scilly, United Kingdom while steaming to Bahia, where she was going to work the rivers as a ferry. Three of her crew died; the rest were saved by the steamship Vigilante (Denmark).
Mavarius	United Kingdom	The ship was wrecked on the Brake Sand.
Sarah	United Kingdom	The Mersey Flat struck the Prince's Landing Stage, Liverpool, Lancashire and consequently sank in the River Mersey. All three people on board were rescued.

== 20 January ==
List of shipwrecks: 20 January 1867
Ship	State	Description
Canto	United Kingdom	The ship was driven ashore and wrecked at Cardiff, Glamorgan. She was on a voyage from Cardiff to Trieste.
Esmeralda	United Kingdom	The schooner struck the Boulder Bank, in the English Channel and sank with the loss of a crew member. She was on a voyage from Caen, Calvados, France to Runcorn, Cheshire.
Eugenie	France	The brig ran aground and was beached at Old Grimsby, Isles of Scilly, United Kingdom. She was on a voyage from Hennebont, Morbihan to Swansea, Glamorgan, United Kingdom.
Gleaner	United Kingdom	The barque ran aground on the English Bank, in the River Plate. She was refloated with assistance from HMS Sharpshooter (Royal Navy) and USS Kansas (United States Navy).
Kathay	United States	The ship was wrecked on Howland Island, Kingdom of Hawaii. Her crew survived.
Miguel Angelo	Spain	The brig struck the breakwater and sank at Falmouth, Cornwall, United Kingdom. Her crew were rescued. She was on a voyage from Havana, Cuba to London, United Kingdom. She was refloated on 6 February.
Robinson	United Kingdom	The ship departed from Sierra Leone for London. No further trace, presumed foundered with the loss of all hands.
Unnamed	United Kingdom	The schooner capsized and sank 20 nautical miles (37 km) south west of Holyhead, Anglesey.

== 21 January ==
List of shipwrecks: 21 January 1867
Ship	State	Description
Amphitrite	Austrian Empire	The barque was driven ashore and wrecked at Buenos Aires, Argentina.
Bonne	France	The brig was wrecked off Chipiona, Spain. She was on a voyage from Swansea, Glamorgan, United Kingdom to Seville, Spain.
Circassian	United Kingdom	The ship was driven ashore near Beaumaris, Anglesey. She was on a voyage from Dundalk, County Louth to Liverpool, Lancashire.
Corea	United Kingdom	The steamship struck a submerged rock and sank near Swatow, China. All on board were rescued. She was on a voyage from Hong Kong to Yokohama, Japan.
D. R. de Wolf	United States	The ship was abandoned in the Atlantic Ocean. Her crew were rescued by Royal Minstrel (United Kingdom). D. R. de Wolf was on a voyage from New York to London, United Kingdom.
Don Miguel	Spain	The ship struck sunken piles at Falmouth, Cornwall, United Kingdom and sank.
James Goode, or Jane Goudie	United Kingdom	The barque was driven ashore at Dungeness, Kent. Her crew were rescued by rocket apparatus. She was on a voyage from Portsmouth, Hampshire to South Shields, County Durham. She had become a wreck by 3 February.
Rinaldo	United Kingdom	The steamship ran aground in the Elbe near Cuxhaven. She was on a voyage from Hamburg to London. She was refloated and resumed her voyage.
Victory	United Kingdom	The tug was sunk by ice at Blackwall, Middlesex.
Zorg en Vlyt	Netherlands	The ship struck the pier and sank at Porthleven, Cornwall, United Kingdom. She was on a voyage from Nantes, Loire-Inférieure, France to Rotterdam, South Holland. She was refloated on 13 February and taken in to Penzance, Cornwall.

== 22 January ==
List of shipwrecks: 22 January 1867
Ship	State	Description
Albert and George	United Kingdom	The ship was driven ashore at Falsterbo, Sweden. She was on a voyage from Memel, Prussia to Hull, Yorkshire. She was refloated and taken in to Helsingør, Denmark.
Ann Mitchell	United Kingdom	The brig ran aground at Dundee, Forfarshire.
Christiana	United Kingdom	The ship ran aground on the West Rocks in the North Sea off the coast of Essex. She was on a voyage from Hartlepool, County Durham to Ostend, West Flanders, Belgium. She was refloated and taken in to Harwich, Essex in a waterlogged condition.
E. H. Fitter	United Kingdom	The ship was abandoned in the Atlantic Ocean. All on board were rescued by Victoire (France).
Fanny Hillbury	United Kingdom	The schooner ran aground on the Kish Bank, in the Irish Sea. She was on a voyage from Liverpool, Lancashire to Sierra Leone. She was refloated.
Gipsy	United Kingdom	The ketch was abandoned at sea. Her crew were rescued. She was on a voyage from Plymouth to Galway.
Hay and Catherine	United Kingdom	The schooner was severely damaged by ice in the River Thames.
Lucy Beazley	United Kingdom	The ship was abandoned in the Atlantic Ocean. Her crew were rescued by Mary (United Kingdom). Lucy Beazley was on a voyage from Liverpool to Santander, Spain.
Mary	United Kingdom	The brig was wrecked on the Holm Sand, in the North Sea off the coast of Suffolk. Her ten crew were rescued by Friendship (United Kingdom). Mary was on a voyage from Hartlepool, County Durham to Ostend, West Flanders, Belgium.
Robert Starret	United Kingdom	The ship struck the Boulmer Steel, on the coast of Northumberland and sank. Her crew were rescued by Abbotsford (United Kingdom). Robert Starret was on a voyage from Newcastle upon Tyne, Northumberland to Kronstadt, Russia.
Rochester	United Kingdom	The barque was abandoned in the Atlantic Ocean. Her crew were rescued. She was on a voyage from Cardiff, Glamorgan to Buenos Aires, Argentina.

== 23 January ==
List of shipwrecks: 23 January 1867
Ship	State	Description
Ann and John	United Kingdom	The brig was driven ashore at Winterton-on-Sea, Norfolk. She was refloated and towed in to Great Yarmouth, Norfolk.
Anna Robertson	United Kingdom	The ship foundered off "Corrobedo", Spain. Her crew were rescued.
Jane Langdale	United Kingdom	The schooner was abandoned off Inchcape, Fife. Her crew were rescued by the barque St. Bede (United Kingdom). Jane Langdale was on a voyage from Sunderland, County Durham to Broughty Ferry, Forfarshire.
Jessie	United Kingdom	The ship was driven ashore at Dundee, Forfarshire.
John	United Kingdom	The smack caught fire, exploded and sank in Walton Bay. Her crew were rescued.
Philemon	United Kingdom	The ship was abandoned off the west coast of Ireland. Her crew were rescued by the steamship Caribbean (United Kingdom) was on a voyage from Garston, Lancashire to Torquay, Devon.
Point de Jour	France	The ship was driven ashore in the Isles of Scilly.
Unnamed	United Kingdom	The barque was driven ashore at the South Foreland, Kent.

== 24 January ==
List of shipwrecks: 24 January 1867
Ship	State	Description
Alliance	United Kingdom	The brig ran aground on the Shipwash Sand, in the North Sea off the coast of Suffolk. She was refloated.
Benton	United Kingdom	The brig was driven ashore and wrecked at Whitburn, County Durham. Her six crew were rescued by the lifeboat Thomas Wilson ( Royal National Lifeboat Institution). Benton was on a voyage from London to the River Tyne.
Canadian	United Kingdom	The brig was wrecked at Agrigento, Sicily, Italy. Her crew survived.
Christina	United States	The ship sank off the Highlands. She was on a voyage from Rio de Janeiro, Brazil to New York.
Elizabeth	United Kingdom	The schooner was damaged by ice in the River Wear.
Emily	(United Kingdom of Great Britain and Ireland) New Zealand	The schooner foundered in fine weather on the bar at Sumner. It is thought that her hull had been previously damaged.
Esk	United Kingdom	The schooner was driven ashore and severely damaged by ice in the River Wear.
Francis Scott	United Kingdom	The smack was abandoned in the Dogger Bank. Her crew were rescued by the smack Ingomar (United Kingdom). Francis Scott was subsequently towed in to Hull, Yorkshire by the smack Pride (United Kingdom).
Freeman	United Kingdom	The ship was driven ashore at Dungeness, Kent. She was on a voyage from London to Boston, Massachusetts, United States. She was refloated on 25 January and put back to London.
John and Mary	United Kingdom	The ship was wrecked on the Cross Sand, in the North Sea off the coast of Norfolk. Her crew were rescued.
Kenilworth	United Kingdom	The ship was driven ashore at the mouth of the Rhône. She was on a voyage from Calcutta, India to Marseille, Bouches-du-Rhône. She was refloated on 27 January.
Maid of the Mill	United Kingdom	The ship was driven ashore and wrecked at the Old Head of Kinsale, County Cork. Her crew were rescued. She was on a voyage from Dover, Kent to Cardiff, Glamorgan.
Mare Pacifico	Greece	The ship departed from Thessaloniki for an English port. No further trace, presumed foundered with the loss of all hands.
Margaret	United Kingdom	The ship sank in Dunfanaghy Bay.
Marie Eugenie	United Kingdom	The ship was driven ashore near Kilmore, County Wexford. She was on a voyage from Liverpool, Lancashire to Nantes, Loire-Inférieure, France.
Sally	United Kingdom	The ship was driven ashore at Donna Nook, Lincolnshire. She was on a voyage from Bruges, East Flanders, Belgium to Sunderland. She was refloated.
William Thrift	United Kingdom	The brig damaged by ice in the River Wear. She was placed under repair.
Yara	United Kingdom	The ship put in to Syros, Greece in a sinking condition. She was on a voyage from Brăila, Ottoman Empire to Falmouth, Cornwall. She was placed under repair.

== 25 January ==
List of shipwrecks: 25 January 1867
Ship	State	Description
Bavaria	United States	The ship was abandoned in the Atlantic Ocean (39°30′N 68°10′W). All 170 people on board were rescued by Resolute (United States). Bavaria was on a voyage from Havre de Grâce, Seine-Inférieure, France to New York.
Frances	United Kingdom	The schooner ras run down by the steamship Sunderland (United Kingdom) and sank off the Haisborough Sands, in the North Sea off the coast of Norfolk with the loss of three of her six crew. Survivors were rescued by Sunderland.
Margaret McBride	United Kingdom	The ship was driven ashore near Dunfanaghy, County Donegal. She was on a voyage from Liverpool, Lancashire to Dunfanaghy. She was refloated on 3 March and towed in to Londonderry for repairs.
Marie Amelie	France	The brig was abandoned in the English Channel off Winchelsea, Sussex and subsequently came ashore. Her thirteen crew were rescued by the Rye Lifeboatl. She was refloated with assistance from the tug Rye (United Kingdom) and taken in to Rye, Sussex.

== 26 January ==
List of shipwrecks: 26 January 1867
Ship	State	Description
Ally	United Kingdom	The schooner ran aground and capsized in the Risle.
Hebe	United Kingdom	The brig capsized and sank in the River Nene near Wisbech, Cambridgeshire.
Houghton	United Kingdom	The steamship was run into and sunk by the schooner Sultana. Her crew were rescued by Sultana. Houghton was on a voyage from Dieppe, Seine-Inférieure, France to Sunderland, County Durham.
Leoné	United Kingdom	The barque was wrecked in Torbay.
Liverpool Packet	United Kingdom	The schooner was driven ashore and wrecked at Aberdeen. Her crew were rescued by the Aberdeen Lifeboat. She was on a voyage from Liverpool, Lancashire to Newcastle upon Tyne, Northumberland.
Mary Hannah	United Kingdom	The schooner was driven ashore near New Romney, Kent. She was on a voyage from Middlesbrough, Yorkshire to Llanelly, Glamorgan. She was refloated the next day and taken in to Dover, Kent in a leaky condition.
Meteor	United Kingdom	The ship was driven ashore near Brielle, South Holland. . She was on a voyage from London to Amsterdam, North Holland. She was refloated but found to be leaky.
Oscar	United Kingdom	The schooner was driven ashore at Lowestoft, Suffolk. Her crew were rescued. She was on a voyage from Harwich, Essex to Sunderland.
Petrel	United Kingdom	The ship was driven ashore at Ayr.
Reflect	United Kingdom	The ship struck the wreck of San Francisco (Brazil) and sank in the River Plate.

== 27 January ==
List of shipwrecks: 27 January 1867
Ship	State	Description
Alfred	United Kingdom	The ship was driven ashore at Port Talbot, Glamorgan. She was refloated on 21 February and towed in to Swansea, Glamorgan.
Knight Companion	United Kingdom	The ship was damaged by fire in the River Thames. She was on a voyage from Calcutta, India to London. She was towed in to Gravesend, Kent.
Lady of the Lake	United Kingdom	The schooner ran aground on the Gaa Sand, at the mouth of the River Tay. She was on a voyage form Sunderland, County Durham to Dunde, Forfarshire. She was refloated and taken in to Dundee.
Oscar	United Kingdom	The schooner was driven ashore at Lowestoft, Suffolk. Her crew were rescued.
Star	United Kingdom	The schooner was driven ashore and wrecked at Cromarty. Her crew were rescued.
Wave	United Kingdom	The barque was driven ashore and wrecked 3 nautical miles (5.6 km) west of Seaford, Sussex. Her crew were rescued. She was on a voyage from New York, United States to London.

== 28 January ==
List of shipwrecks: 28 January 1867
Ship	State	Description
Allerston	United Kingdom	The ship ran aground on the Shipwash Sand, in the North Sea off the coast of Suffolk. She was on a voyage from Sunderland, County Durham to Martinique. She was refloated and put in to Harwich, Essex.
Amity	United Kingdom	The ship was wrecked near Walton-on-the-Naze, Essex. She was on a voyage from Rye, Sussex to Sunderland.
Ann and Margaret	United Kingdom	The schooner ran aground on the Navestone, in the Farne Islands, Northumberland. She floated off on 1 February and sank Her crew were rescued.
City of Delhi	United Kingdom	The ship was driven ashore at Dungeness, Kent. She was on a voyage from Singapore, Straits Settlements to London. She had become a wreck by 31 January.
Elizabeth	United Kingdom	The schooner was driven ashore at Goswick, Northumberland. She was on a voyage from Aberdeen to Newcastle upon Tyne, Northumberland.
Emerald	United Kingdom	The ship was driven ashore at Cap la Heve, Seine-Inférieure, France. She was on a voyage from Havre de Grâce, Seine-Inférieure to Newcastle upon Tyne. She was refloated the next day with assistance from the tug Abeille No.2 (France) and towed in to Havre de Grâce.
Fortuna	United Kingdom	The steamship was driven ashore at Atherfield, Isle of Wight. Her crew were rescued by rocket apparatus. She was on a voyage from the Mediterranean to London, or from London to Lisbon, Portugal.
Frolic	United Kingdom	The smack was driven ashore and wrecked at Llanon, Cardiganshire. Her crew were rescued.
Jonge Jan and Margaretha	Netherlands	The galiot was wrecked near Callantsoog, North Holland. She was on a voyage from Newcastle upon Tyne to Amsterdam, North Holland. She was refloated on 20 February and taken in to the Nieuw Diep.
Laura	United Kingdom	The brig ran aground on the Scroby Sands, Norfolk. She was on a voyage from South Shields, County Durham to Southampton, Hampshire. She was refloated.
Lord Haddo	United Kingdom	The barque ran aground on the Barnard Sand, in the North Sea off the coast of Suffolk. She was refloated and taken in to Lowestoft, Suffolk.
Medium	United Kingdom	The barque ran aground and sank on the Lemon and Ower Sand, in the North Sea. She was on a voyage from Odesa, Russia to Alloa, Clackmannanshire.
Moonlight	United States	The ship ran aground on the Shipwash Sand. She was on a voyage from South Shields to Aden. She was refloated with the assistance of two smacks and taken in to Harwich.
Prudent	France	The schooner foundered off the North Foreland, Kent, United Kingdom. Her crew were rescued. She was on a voyage from Sunderland to Nantes, Loire-Inférieure.
Rockaway	United Kingdom	The barque was abandoned off Ilfracombe, Devon. She was on a voyage from Newry, County Antrim to Newport, Monmouthshire or vice versa. She came ashore the next day and was wrecked.

== 29 January ==
List of shipwrecks: 29 January 1867
Ship	State	Description
Julia Heinrich	Flag unknown	The ship departed from the Dardanelles for a British port. No further trace, presumed foundered with the loss of all hands.
Malta	United Kingdom	The ship ran aground on the Whiting Sand, in the North Sea off the coast of Suffolk. She was on a voyage from Newcastle upon Tyne, Northumberland to London. She was refloated.
Oneira	United Kingdom	The ship was holed by ice in New York Bay and was beached on Staten Island. She was on a voyage from Calcutta, India to Liverpool, Lancashire. She was refloated on 1 February and taken in to New York for repairs.
Rockaway	United Kingdom	The ship was abandoned off Morte Point, Devon. Her crew were rescued. She was on a voyage from Newry, County Antrim to Newport, Monmouthshire.
Union	United Kingdom	The ship was driven ashore at Withernsea, Yorkshire. Her crew were rescued. She was on a voyage from Sunderland, County Durham to Boulogne, Pas-de-Calais, France. She was refloated and taken in to Bridlington, Yorkshire in a leaky condition.
Veracity	United Kingdom	The schooner ran aground at Wells-next-the-Sea, Norfolk. She was on a voyage from Middlesbrough, Yorkshire to Wells-next-the-Sea.

== 30 January ==
List of shipwrecks: 30 January 1867
Ship	State	Description
Artemis	United Kingdom	The steamship was driven ashore at Landskrona, Sweden. She was on a voyage from Newcastle upon Tyne, Northumberland to Landskrona. She was refloated the next day and taken in to Landskrona.
Artemas	United Kingdom	The brigantine was wrecked on the Gunfleet Sand, in the North Sea off the coast of Suffolk. Her crew were rescued. She was on a voyage from London to Newcastle upon Tyne.
Clara Hickman	United States	The ship was abandoned in the Atlantic Ocean. She was on a voyage from Baltimore, Maryland to Queenstown, County Cork, United Kingdom.
Croix de Means	France	The ship was driven ashore at Nethertown, Cumberland, United Kingdom. She was on a voyage from Santander, Spain to Silloth, Cumberland.
Henry	United Kingdom	The brigantine was driven ashore and wrecked on Guernsey, Channel Islands. She was on a voyage from Exeter, Devon to Guernsey, Channel Islands.
Monarchy	United Kingdom	The ship collided with a schooner and sank at Rotterdam, South Holland, Netherlands with the loss of all hands. She was on a voyage from Foo Chow Foo, China to Rotterdam.
Proteus	United Kingdom	The ship sank in Dungarvan Bay. She was on a voyage from Cardiff, Glamorgan to Southampton, Hampshire.
Xanthe	United Kingdom	The steamship was driven ashore near Torekov, Sweden. She was on a voyage from Hartlepool, County Durham to Copenhagen, Denmark. She was refloated on 4 February, but had to be beached. Xanthe was refloated on 13 February and towed in to Helsingør, Denmark.

== 31 January ==
List of shipwrecks: 31 January 1867
Ship	State	Description
Alster	United Kingdom	The brig ran aground on the Maplin Sand, in the North Sea off the coast of Essex.
Conqueror	United Kingdom	The brigantine was run into by the steamship Hilda (United Kingdom) and sank in the River Thames at Thames Haven, Essex.
Edith	United Kingdom	The ship departed from Table Bay for Port Alfred, Cape Colony. No further trace, presumed foundered with the loss of all hands.
Emma Hains	United States	The ship was driven ashore neat St. Jago de Cuba, Cuba. She was on a voyage from Caracas, Venezuela to Boston, Massachusetts.
Fannie Matilda	United Kingdom	The ship departed from Newport, Monmouthshire for Saint Thomas, Virgin Islands. No further trace, presumed foundered with the loss of all hands.
Hope	(United Kingdom of Great Britain and Ireland) Jersey	The ship was driven ashore at Southend-on-Sea, Essex. She was on a voyage from Guernsey, Channel Islands to London.
Opal	United Kingdom	The brig ran aground on the Whitburn Steel. She was on a voyage from Rouen, Seine-Inférieure, France to North Shields, Northumberland. She was refloated and assisted in to North Shields.
Symmetry	United Kingdom	The ship was wrecked at Langness Point, Isle of Man. Her crew were rescued. She was on a voyage from Liverpool, Lancashire to Africa.

== Unknown date ==
List of shipwrecks: Unknown date in January 1867
Ship	State	Description
Agamemnon	United Kingdom	The ship was driven ashore. She was on a voyage from Shanghai, China to London. She was refloated and taken in to Singapore, Straits Settlements.
Alice Gray	United Kingdom	The ship was abandoned in the Atlantic Ocean.
Alma	United Kingdom	The barque was abandoned in the Atlantic Ocean. She was on a voyage from Cow Bay, Nova Scotia, British North America to New York, United States.
Amanda	United States	The ship was driven ashore at Galveston, Texas. She was on a voyage from Pensacola, Florida to Galveston.
Anglo-Dane	United Kingdom	The steamship was driven ashore. She was on a voyage from Danzig to Hull, Yorkshire. She was refloated and taken in to Ystad, Sweden in a leaky condition.
Anna Robertson	United Kingdom	The ship foundered off "Corrobedo". Her crew were rescued.
Bella Antonia	Spain	The ship was driven ashore near Cádiz.
Brutus	United Kingdom	The ship was run down and sunk in the Atlantic Ocean by the frigate Flandre (French Navy) with the loss of ten of her fourteen crew. She was on a voyage from Cartagena, Spain to Newcastle upon Tyne, Northumberland.
Caduceus	United Kingdom	The ship was driven ashore. She was on a voyage from Foochow, China to Shanghai. She was refloated and taken in to Amoy.
Certes	United Kingdom	The steamship was driven ashore near Huelva, Spain. She was on a voyage from Liverpool, Lancashire to Cádiz.
Charlotte	United Kingdom	The ship was driven ashore and wrecked at Flamborough Head, Yorkshire with the loss of all four crew. She was on a voyage from Gothenburg, Sweden to Sunderland.
China	United Kingdom	The ship was driven ashore. She was refloated and taken in to Hong Kong.
Coalition	(United Kingdom of Great Britain and Ireland) British North America	The ship was wrecked at Cape Race, Newfoundland. She was on a voyage from Montreal, Province of Canada to Harbour Grace, Nova Scotia.
Contape	United Kingdom	The ship foundered in the Atlantic Ocean before 20 January. Her crew were rescued by Progress (United Kingdom). Contape was on a voyage from Pensacola, Florida to Queenstown, County Cork.
Cortes	United Kingdom	The ship foundered in the Irish Sea. Her crew were rescued.
Courrier de St. Pierre	France	The ship ran aground on the Platregaes Rocks before 9 January. She was on a voyage from Swansea, Glamorgan to Saint-Nazaire, Loire-Inférieure. She was refloated and taken in to Camaret-sur-Mer, Finistère in a severely leaky condition.
Dantzic	United Kingdom	The brig was abandoned in the North Sea between 15 and 26 January. She was on a voyage from South Shields to London. She was taken in to Scarborough, Yorkshire by the smack Queen of England (United Kingdom).
Duke	United Kingdom	The ship was wrecked on Barbuda. She was on a voyage from Cardiff to Jamaica.
Ella	(United Kingdom of Great Britain and Ireland) British North America	The ship was driven ashore and destroyed by fire near Campbeltown, Argyllshire.
Enchantress	United Kingdom	The ship foundered off Penzance, Cornwall. She was on a voyage from Odesa to Falmouth, Cornwall.
Enigheden	Sweden	The schooner was driven ashore on Læsø, Denmark. She was on a voyage from Hartlepool, County Durham, United Kingdom to Kalmar.
Erin	United Kingdom	The ship ran aground on the Oyster Island Reefs, in New York Bay. She was on a voyage from Liverpool to New York.
Evening Star	United States	The steamship ran aground at the mouth of the Mississippi River.
Express	United Kingdom	The schooner was abandoned in the Atlantic Ocean before 28 January. Her crew were rescued. She was on a voyage from Trinidad to Great Yarmouth, Norfolk.
Farmers Lass	United Kingdom	The ship was driven ashore before 10 January. She was on a voyage from Caen, Calvados to Liverpool. She was refloated and taken in to Cowes, Isle of Wight.
Forest Queen	United Kingdom	The ship foundered with loss of life, including that of her captain. She was on a voyage from London to Poole, Dorset.
Frederick	Bremen	The ship was driven ashore at Thisted, Denmark. She was on a voyage from Bremen to Stockholm, Sweden.
Gardella	Italy	The barque was wrecked on the Pladdy Lug Rock, in the Strangford Lough with the loss of all hands. She was on a voyage from Ardrossan, Ayrshire, United Kingdom to Genoa.
Garrell	United Kingdom	The brigantine was driven ashore at Kessingland, Suffolk.
Gazelle	United Kingdom	The barque was wrecked at Agrigento, Sicily, Italy. Her crew survived.
George and Lucy	United Kingdom	The ship was lost near Riga, Russia. She was on a voyage from Riga to Hull.
Giovannio	Italy	The schooner was holed by ice in the Elbe and was beached downstream of Stade, Prussia before 10 January. She was on a voyage from Hamburg to Bristol, Gloucestershire, United Kingdom.
Hebron	United Kingdom	The Yorkshire Billyboy was driven ashore at Filey, Yorkshire. She was on a voyage from Boston, Lincolnshire to Blyth, Northumberland.
James Bales	United Kingdom	The brig foundered in the English Channel off the coast of Devon with the loss of all hands.
Jeune Leonora	France	The lugger collided with the schooner Boris (Russia) and sank off the Galloper Sand, in the North Sea with the loss of four of her seven crew. Survivors were rescued by Boris.
Jeune Matheurin	France	The ship was driven ashore at "Poulignen", Loire-Inférieure. She was on a voyage from Cardiff to Nantes, Loire-Inférieure.
John Duthie	United Kingdom	The ship caught fire at Galle, Ceylon and was scuttled.
John W. Lowe	United States	The fishing schooner probably was lost in gale of the 17th returning from Newfoundland. Lost with all 9 hands.
Juana	Netherlands	The ship was wrecked. She was on a voyage from Trinidad to Amsterdam.
Juno	United Kingdom	The steamship was wrecked at Hela, Prussia. Her crew were rescued. She was on a voyage from Memel, Prussia to the Weser.
Konig Willem III	Netherlands	The ship was lost in the South China Sea. She was on a voyage from Macao, qing dynasty to Saigon, French Indochina.
Lesborough	United Kingdom	The steamship was driven ashore at Augusta, Sicily, Italy. She was on a voyage from Newcastle upon Tyne to Catania, Sicily.
Maria	Portugal	The ship was wrecked near Vigo, Spain. She was on a voyage from Maranhão, Brazil to Porto.
Marie Eulalie	France	The ship was driven ashore on the Île de Ré, Charente-Inférieure. She was on a voyage from "Moricq", Vendée to Belfast, County Antrim, United Kingdom. She was refloated and taken in to La Flotte, Loire-Inférieure.
Martha	Netherlands	The ship was lost with all hands off "Avenga", Italy before 21 January. She was on a voyage from Newcastle upon Tyneto Livorno, Italy.
Mathilde	Denmark	The ship was taken in to Marstrand, Sweden in a derelict condition. She was on a voyage from Sunderland, County Durham to Copenhagen.
Melita	Malta	The ship was wrecked at "Fanata", Albania. Her seven crew survived.
Mentor	Sweden	The barque was driven ashore on Valentia Island, County Kerry, United Kingdom. Her crew were rescued. She was on a voyage from Pensacola, Florida, United States to Liverpool.
Navarino	United Kingdom	The schooner ran aground on the Brake Sand before 8 January with the loss of all hands. She later floated off, and came ashore in Pegwell Bay, Kent on 18 January.
Newcastle	United Kingdom	The barque struck the Haisborough Sands and sank with the loss of two of her eleven crew. Survivors were rescued by the schooner Dolphin (Netherlands). Newcastle was on a voyage from Newcastle upon Tyne to Alexandria, Egypt.
Patriarch	United Kingdom	The ship was destroyed at Amsterdam, North Holland by an explosion of nitroglycerine. She was on a voyage from Hamburg to Caernarfon.
Pedro	Spain	The ship was lost off Conil.
Prince Albert	(United Kingdom of Great Britain and Ireland) Guernsey	The ship was driven ashore and wrecked at Corton, Suffolk. Her crew were rescued by rocket apparatus.
Rambler	United Kingdom	The ship was abandoned off the Haisborough Sands in the North Sea off the coast of Norfolk. She was on a voyage from Wells-next-the-Sea, Norfolk to Newcastle upon Tyne.
Roma	United Kingdom	The steamship was driven ashore at Grado, Italy.
Royal Sovereign	United Kingdom	The ship was destroyed by fire 9 nautical miles (17 km) downstream of New Orleans, Louisiana, United States before 24 January.
Sabug	United Kingdom	The steamship was wrecked on Rodrigues.
Sarah Ann	United Kingdom	The ship was driven ashore and wrecked at Covehithe, Suffolk.
Simon Hobly	United Kingdom	The barque collided with Star of the Union (United States) and sank off Cape Horn, Chile, Her crew were rescued.
Symmetry	United Kingdom	The brig was driven ashore and wrecked near "Bonholm", Sweden Her crew were rescued. She was on a voyage from a Baltic port to the River Tyne.
Themis, and an unidentified vessel	Bremen; Flag unknown	A powder hulk exploded at Hong Kong, destroying the schooner Themis. There was large loss of life.
Unison	United Kingdom	The brig struck Mental's Rock and was wrecked. Her crew were rescued. She was on a voyage from Limerick to Odesa, Russia.
Valencia	United Kingdom	The steamship was lost.
Zuleika	United Kingdom	The brig was driven ashore on Rainsford Island, Massachusetts, United States before 19 January. Her crew were rescued. She was on a voyage from Boston, Massachusetts to Africa.
Unidentified steamship	Flag unknown	A steamship was lost with only 80 of the 400 people aboard found.
Unnamed	Flag unknown	The ship either foundered or was run down of the Newcombe Sand, in the North Sea off the coast of Suffolk.
Unnamed	Flag unknown	The ship ran aground on Scroby Sands, Norfolk. She floated off but consequently foundered with the loss of all hands.
