= Killas =

Rock formation

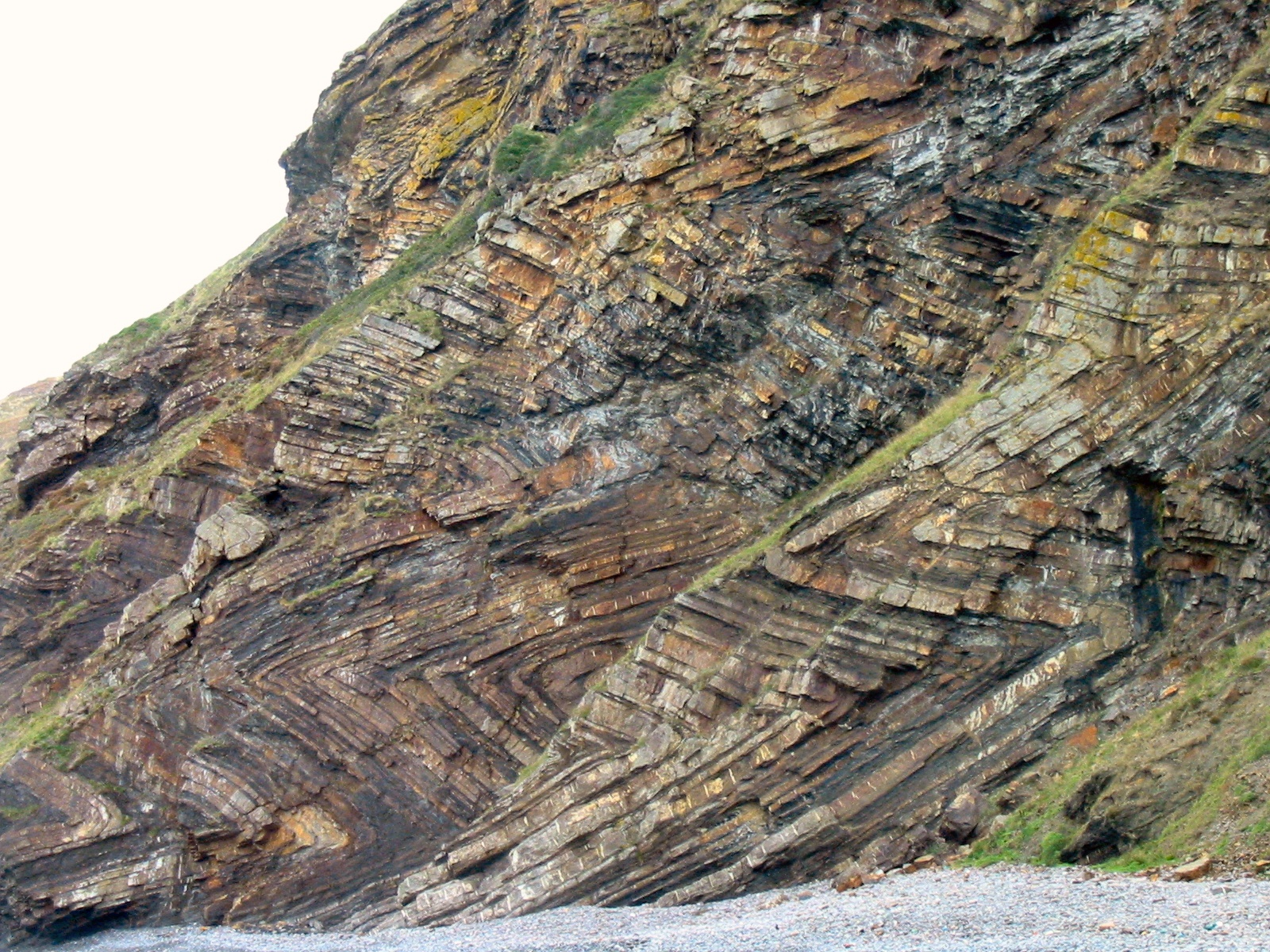
The recumbent chevron folds in the cliffs at Millook, considered to be killas, in Cornwall

Killas is a Cornish mining term for metamorphic rock strata of sedimentary origin which was altered regionally by the Variscan orogeny and then locally by heat from the intruded granites in the English counties of Devon and Cornwall. The term is used in both counties.

== Etymology ==
"Killas" first appeared in print in 1674 as "kellus". As a Cornish place name element, kellys is found in Porkellis where it means 'lost' or 'hidden' (a passive-participle), but its etymology as Cornish dialect is unknown. The reconstructed proto-Celtic verb *kel-o- from the PIE *_{4}k̑el- also means 'to hide'.

== Petrogenesis ==
The deposition of the killas strata occurred during the Devonian and Carboniferous geological periods. The sediments are not evenly spread over the county, with the Carboniferous beds only found in the north of Cornwall.

The depositional environments of the killas were very varied, as is revealed by the fossil content and the sedimentary sequences. The fossils indicate changes from anaerobic, deep ocean-basin environments to shallow sea environments. The deformed brachiopod fossil Cyrtospirifer verneuili, known to quarrymen as the Delabole Butterfly, was found in the upper Devonian beds of North Cornwall.

Shortly after the deposition of the sediments, the Variscan orogeny caused low grade regional metamorphism of the sediment followed by the intrusion of the Cornubian batholith and the subsequent contact metamorphism created the metamorphic rocks seen today. The orogeny put intense pressure on the sediments causing them to be folded and faulted. This is most apparent in the cliffs at Millook Haven on the north Cornwall coast, where the cliffs display an impressive series of recumbent angular folds.

== Economic uses ==
Killas underlies two thirds of Cornwall and on and around Dartmoor in Devon, and, as a result of hydrothermal mineralization from the granites, contain the majority of the mineral lodes or veins which at one time provided up to half of the world's tin and copper, and economic prosperity to Cornwall (and to a lesser extent Devon). Of lesser economic importance, the stone itself is an important building stone, while locally, in the Delabole to Tintagel region, there are good quality roofing slates with the largest single source in the county being Delabole slate quarry, which has provided a high quality stone for at least six centuries.

== See also ==
- Cornish Killas - national character area 152
