= Chevron (land form) =

Wedge-shaped sediment deposit observed on coastlines and continental interiors

A chevron is a wedge-shaped sediment deposit observed on coastlines and continental interiors around the world. The term chevron was originally used independently by Maxwell and Haynes and Hearty and others for large, V-shaped, sub-linear to parabolic landforms in southwestern Egypt and on islands in the eastern, windward Bahamas.

== General ==
The Egyptian “chevrons” are active, wind-generated dunes, but the “chevrons” in the Bahamas are inactive and have been variously interpreted. The most common interpretation of large, chevron-shaped bed forms is that they are a form of parabolic dune, and that most examples are generated by wind action.

Many chevrons can be found in Australia, but others are concentrated around the coastlines of the world. For instance there are chevrons in Hither Hills State Park on Long Island and in Madagascar (such as the Fenambosy Chevron), as well as in interior sites of the United States such as the Palouse region of eastern Washington State, the Great Sand Dunes National Park and Preserve, and White Sands National Park.

== Formation ==
According to Hansen et al. 2015, powerful storms and changes in sea level rise can explain chevrons. An example of the formation of chevrons can be seen in the Bahamas, where the lightly indurated ooid sand ridges appear to have been created by the impact of strong waves over a long period of time. Subsequently, the internal structure of the chevrons showed that they were "rapidly emplaced by water rather than wind". The notion that chevrons are caused by powerful storm surges rather than wind can also be attributed to tsunami deposits, with examples of complex chevron formations being found several kilometres inland, at high elevations and on shorelines without beaches. The Holocene Impact Research Group hypothesizes that the formations could be caused by tsunamis from meteorite impacts or submarine slides which lift sediment up and carry it hundreds of miles until depositing it on coastlines. Part of the evidence they cite for this hypothesis is that the sediments contain tiny marine fossils; however, such fossils can be moved by the wind, just like sand.

In 2017, Abbott et al. reported that the Madagascar chevrons contain considerable quantities of early Holocene carbonate samples that resemble marine foraminifera shells, including those that are partly dolomitized and others that are infilled with mud. These findings show that the chevrons' marine carbonate tests were eroded from the continental shelf, rather than from current beaches.

The impact idea is controversial not only because chevrons are similar to wind-blown landforms found far from the ocean, but also because it is unlikely that there have been enough large impacts and landslides to explain the observed chevrons. Moreover, some computer models and sediment-transport analysis do not support this theory. For example, the orientation of chevrons along the southern coast of Madagascar do not line up with what these models of mega-tsunamis have simulated. Additional evidence against the mega-tsunami hypothesis is that the force of the water would not produce such regular bed forms.

== See also ==
- Chevron (geology)
