= Fenambosy Chevron =

Land feature on the coast of Madagascar

Coordinates: 25.016707°S 44.177118°E

The Fenambosy Chevron is one of four chevron-shaped land features on the southwest coast of Madagascar, near the tip of Madagascar, 180 meters (590 ft) high and 5 kilometres (3.1 mi) inland. Chevrons such as Fenambosy have been hypothesized as providing evidence of "megatsunamis" caused by comets or asteroids crashing into Earth, although has been challenged by other geologists and oceanographers.

The Burckle crater about 1,700 kilometres (1,100 mi) east-southeast of the Madagascar chevrons is hypothesized to be an asteroid impact crater that caused the megatsunami about 4,500 to 5,000 years ago.
