= Millook =

Hamlet in Cornwall, England

Coordinates: 50.7713°N 4.5759°W

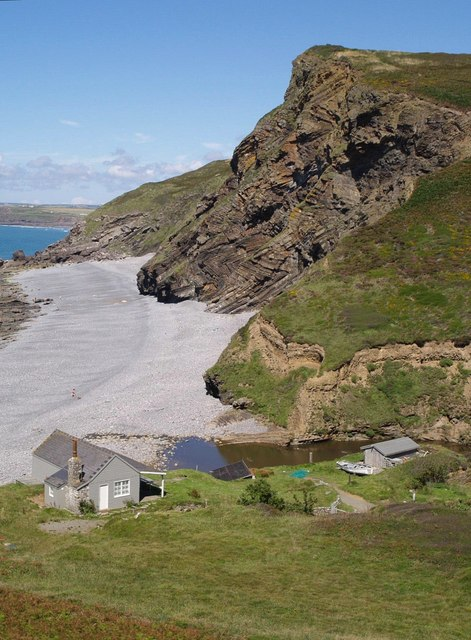
Millook Haven

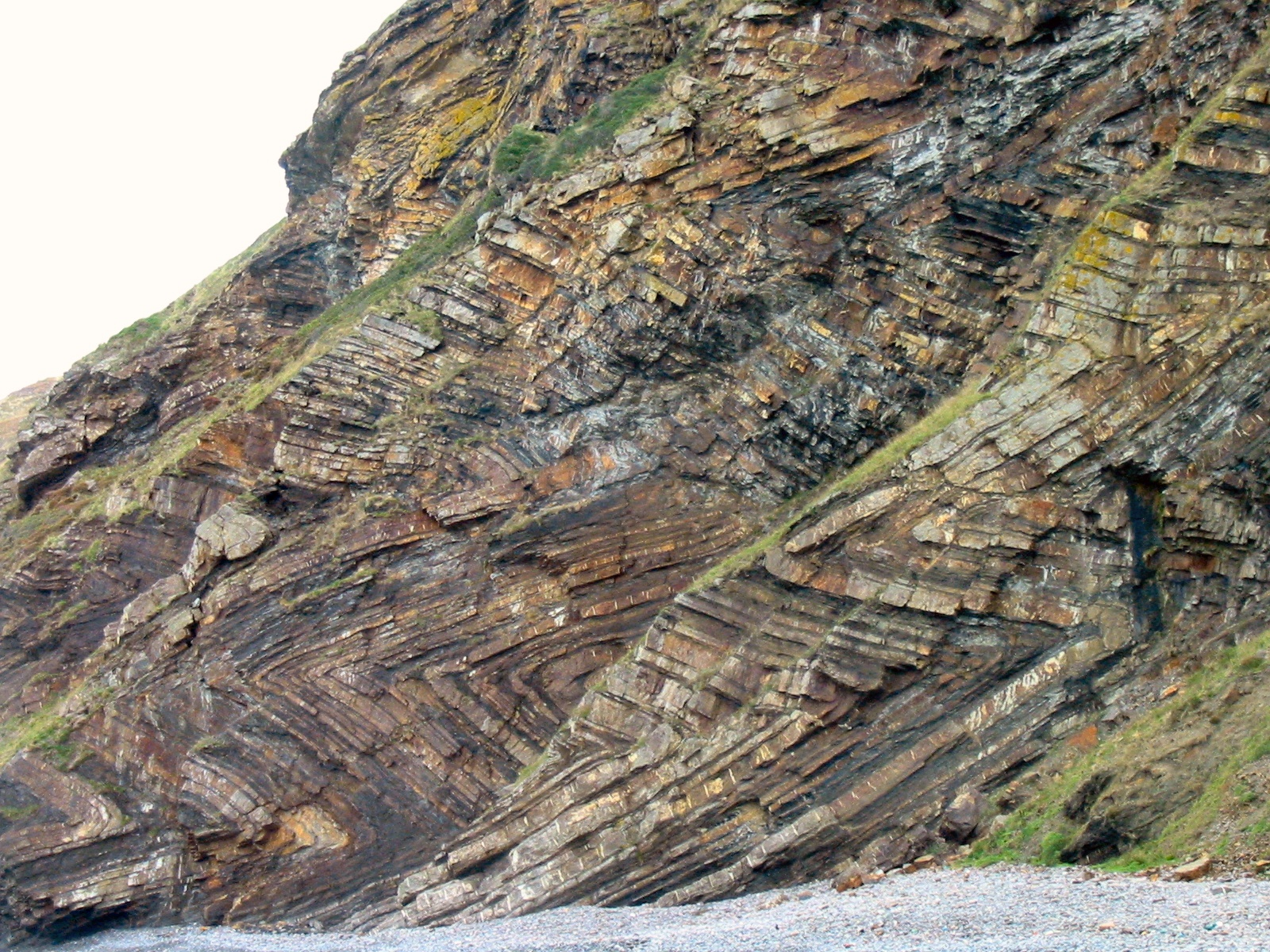
Chevron folds with flat-lying axial planes

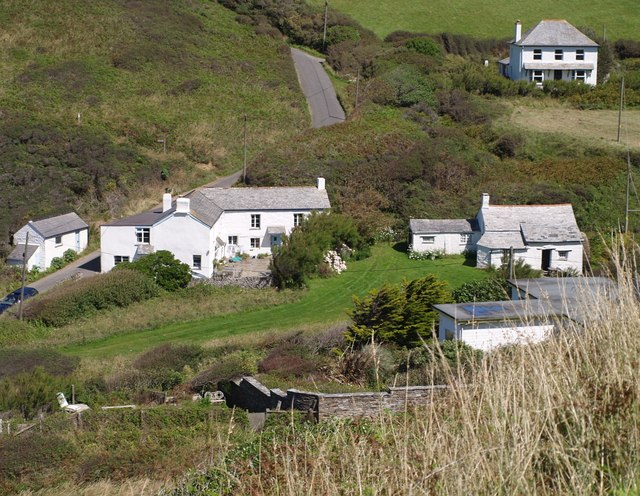
Millook

Millook is a deep coastal valley and hamlet in the parish of Poundstock, on the north coast of Cornwall, England.

In 2014 the cliffs at Millook Haven were voted by the Geological Society of London as one of Britain's top 10 geological sites, leading the "folding and faulting" category. The cliffs display an impressive series of recumbent chevron folds, in Carboniferous age killas of inter-bedded sandstones and shales, originally deposited in deep water. The stony beach is popular with surfers despite there being few parking spaces and the South West Coast Path passes through the seaward end of the valley. The ancient semi-natural woodland has been described as the best ravine wood in Cornwall and along with the coast is within the Cornwall Area of Outstanding Natural Beauty.

== Millook Valley Woods ==
The 60.67 ha (149.9 acres) woodland runs roughly north-south from the A39 at Wainhouse Corner to the coast at Millook Haven. It consists of four separate properties now owned by the Woodland Trust; Crannow Coombe and Lundy Woods, Tamps and Landy, Trebarfoote and Trengayor Copse, as well as some private owners. With the exception of Trebarfoote the woods are mainly on the western slopes of the valley. Described in a 1993 report to the JNCC as the “best ravine wood in Cornwall” the site was previously listed as a Site of Special Scientific Interest (SSSI). Most of the woods are ancient semi-natural woodland but only Trebarfoote and the valley bottoms are officially designated as such. When compared to the Ordnance Survey map published in the 1930s the woodland is now much larger.

=== Flora and fauna ===
Adjacent to the streams there is a wet alluvial soil and willow carr. The trees in the valley bottoms are mainly old coppice and maiden oak (Quercus petraea) with some ash (Fraxinus excelsior) and sycamore (Acer pseudoplatanus). On the mid to upper slopes there is increasing amounts of sycamore with a mixture of blackthorn (Prunus spinosa) and hawthorn (Crataegus monogyna) on clayey loam, and at the top invading bracken (Pteridium aquilinum), bramble (Rubus fruticosus) and gorse (Ulex europaeus). The surrounding area is mainly agricultural. Other tree species found are alder (Alnus glutinosa) in the wetter areas and a few small areas of wild cherry (Prunus avium) and wild service (Sorbus torminalis). Aspen (Populus tremula) and beech (Fagus sylvatica) on old boundary hedges are presumed to be planted.
