= Chevron (geology) =

Structural feature in geology

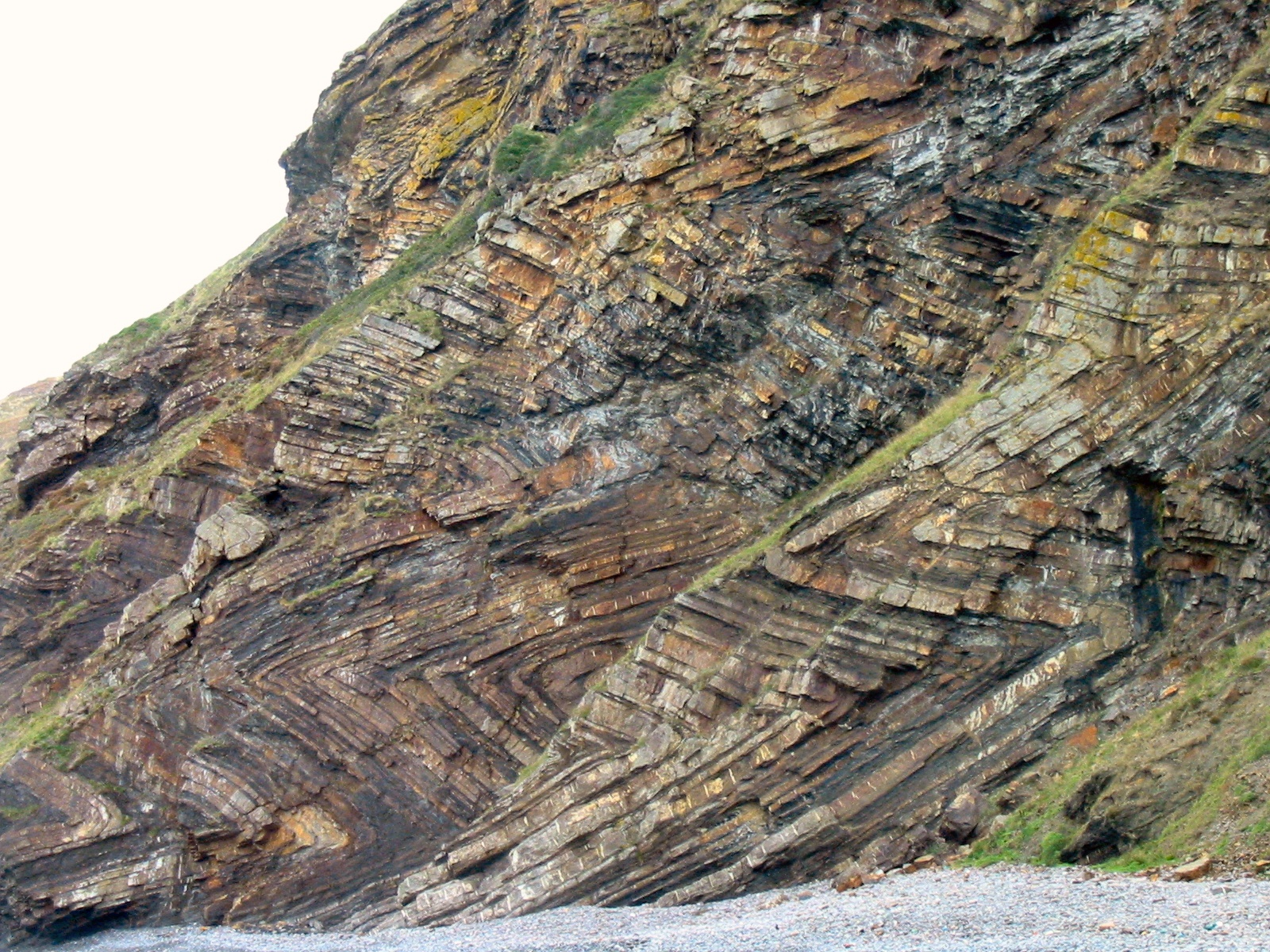
Chevron folds with flat-lying axial planes, Millook Haven, North Cornwall, UK

Chevron folds are a structural feature characterized by repeated well behaved folded beds with straight limbs and sharp hinges. Well developed, these folds develop repeated set of v-shaped beds. They develop in response to regional or local compressive stress. Inter-limb angles are generally 60 degrees or less. Chevron folding preferentially occurs when the bedding regularly alternates between contrasting competences. Turbidites, characterized by alternating high-competence sandstones and low-competence shales, provide the typical geological setting for chevron folds to occur.

Perpetuation of the fold structure is not geometrically limited. Given a proper stratigraphy, chevrons can persist almost indefinitely.

== Fold process ==
In response to compressional stress, geological beds fold in order to minimize dissipation of energy. Given an unconstrained bed, folding does so by correspondingly minimizing bending and thus develops a sinusoidal geometry. In a stratigraphic sequence, beds are geometrically and physically constrained by their neighbours. Similarity must be maintained. To accommodate such constraints while maintaining sinusoidal geometry, less competent layers would need to be subjected to extensive flow. Kinked, yielding and highly localized hinges with straight limbs greatly reduce the geometrical need for deformation. Chevron folds are energetically preferred to conventional sinusoidal folds as they minimize ductile flow to the expense of localized bending.

Four stages mark development of chevron folds: sinusoidal nucleation, concentric folding, straightening of limbs/sharpening of hinges, and tightening of the chevron fold. When inter-limb angles approach 60 degrees, frictional forces limit simple shear and flow deformation in less competent layers and favors pure shear of the whole stratigraphic complex. Therefore, the inter-limb angle, rapidly decreasing as a function of time given larger angles begins to stabilize as the angle nears 60 degrees. There is, however, no physical limitation on the acuteness of the fold.

Saddle reef structures, hinge collapse and/or simply dilation of incompetent layer commonly accommodates the geometrical void created in the hinge during folding. While the incompetent layer deforms and flows, thus having complex cleavage patterns, competent layers tend to fracture radially at the hinge. These fractures are commonly infilled with crystalline veins.

== Factors affecting folding ==
The behavior of chevron folds are effectively controlled by the characteristics of the stratigraphy under deformation. Ideally, beds should alternate between high competence and low competence. The stability of chevron folding stringently requires regular thickness in the high-competence layers; conversely, regularity in low competence layers has been found to have very little effect on stability. The length of the bed and the thickness of competent beds further determines the structural stability. A 1:10 ratio between the thickness of competent beds and the length appears to be the threshold required for the formation of chevron folds. Smaller ratios require too much flow in the more ductile layers. Given high length to thickness and low high-competency to low-competency thickness ratios, irregularities in the thickness of the high-competence beds can be accommodated. However, local features appear as a consequence.

Anomalously thick beds develop bulbous hinges, hinge collapse, hinges thrusts and/or compress via ductile flow. On the other hand, anomalously thin beds develop boudinage and/or extension via ductile flow.

== See also ==
- Chevron (land form)
