= Bogambara (Kandy Four Gravets & Gangawata Korale) Grama Niladhari Division =

Bogambara
- Grama Niladhari Division
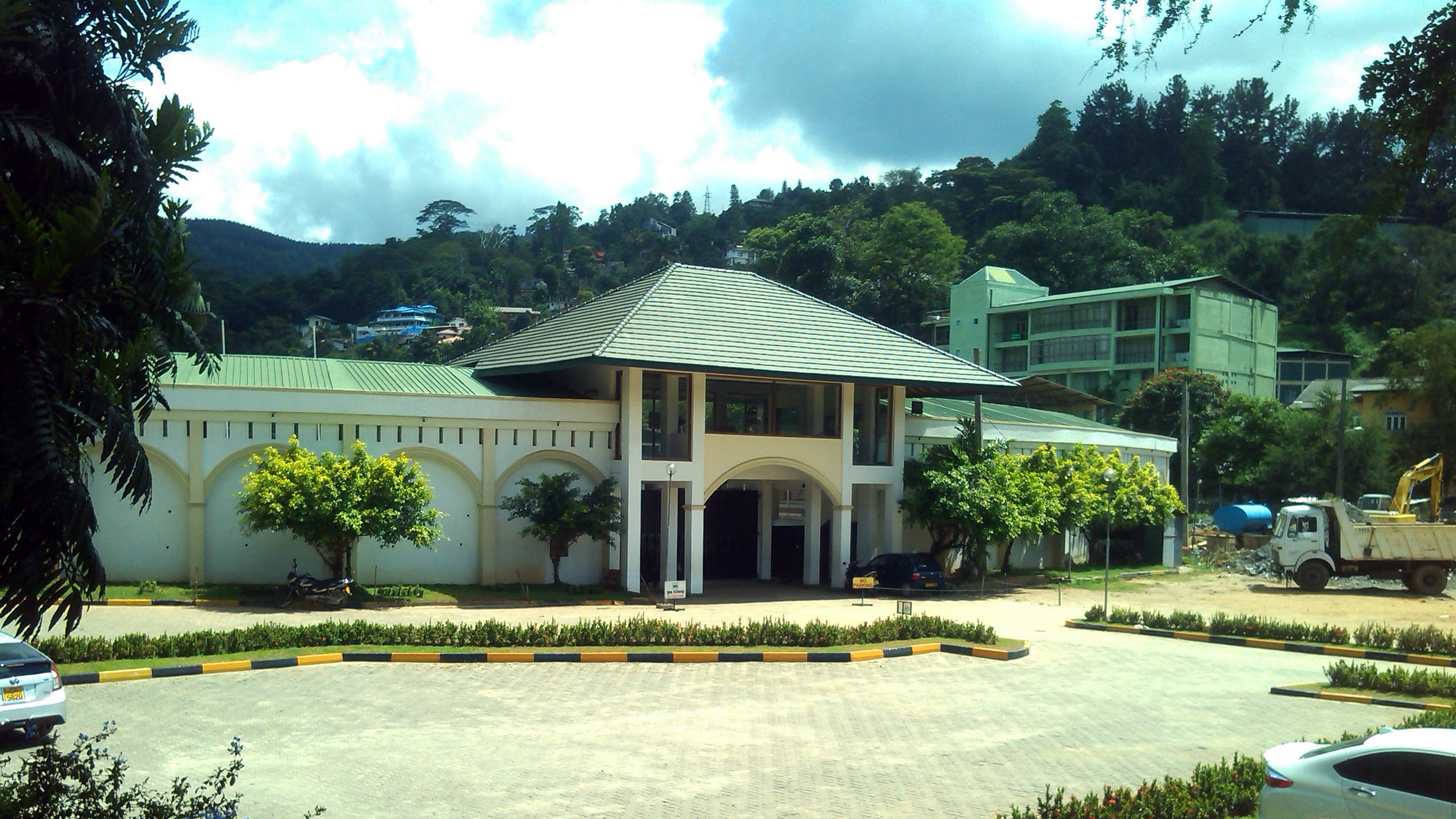
- Bogambara Stadium is located within, nearby or associated with the Bogambara Grama Niladhari Division
- Interactive map of Bogambara
- Coordinates: 7.287754°N 80.635184°E
- Country: Sri Lanka
- Province: Central Province
- District: Kandy District
- Divisional Secretariat: Kandy Four Gravets & Gangawata Korale Divisional Secretariat
- Electoral District: Kandy Electoral District
- Polling Division: Mahanuwara Polling Division

Area
  - Total: 0.37 km^{2} (0.14 sq mi)
- Elevation: 534 m (1,752 ft)

Population (2012)
  - Total: 3,195
  - Density: 8,635/km^{2} (22,360/sq mi)
- ISO 3166 code: LK-2130145

Bogambara

Bogambara Grama Niladhari Division is a Grama Niladhari Division of the Kandy Four Gravets & Gangawata Korale Divisional Secretariat of Kandy District of Central Province, Sri Lanka. It has Grama Niladhari Division Code 264.

Bogambara Stadium, Bogambara Prison, Wales Park, Kandy railway station, Teaching Hospital, Kandy, Kandy General Post Office, Kandy City Centre, National Institute of Fundamental Studies (NIFS), Arthur's Seat, Kandy and Kandy Clock Tower are located within, nearby or associated with Bogambara.

Bogambara is a surrounded by the Malwatta, Hanthna Pedesa, Nagasthenna, Deiyannewela, Ihala Katukele and Mahanuwara Grama Niladhari Divisions.

== Demographics ==
=== Ethnicity ===
The Bogambara Grama Niladhari Division has a Sinhalese majority (84.6%). In comparison, the Kandy Four Gravets & Gangawata Korale Divisional Secretariat (which contains the Bogambara Grama Niladhari Division) has a Sinhalese majority (74.6%) and a significant Moor population (10.9%)

Ethnicity in Bogambara
1. Sinhalese (84.6%)
2. Sri Lankan Tamil (8.10%)
3. Moor (5.30%)
4. Other (1.90%)

=== Religion ===
The Bogambara Grama Niladhari Division has a Buddhist majority (81.1%). In comparison, the Kandy Four Gravets & Gangawata Korale Divisional Secretariat (which contains the Bogambara Grama Niladhari Division) has a Buddhist majority (70.9%), a significant Muslim population (12.0%) and a significant Hindu population (10.2%)

Religion in Bogambara
1. Buddhist (81.1%)
2. Hindu (7.50%)
3. Muslim (6.00%)
4. Roman Catholic (4.90%)
5. Other (0.60%)

== Gallery ==
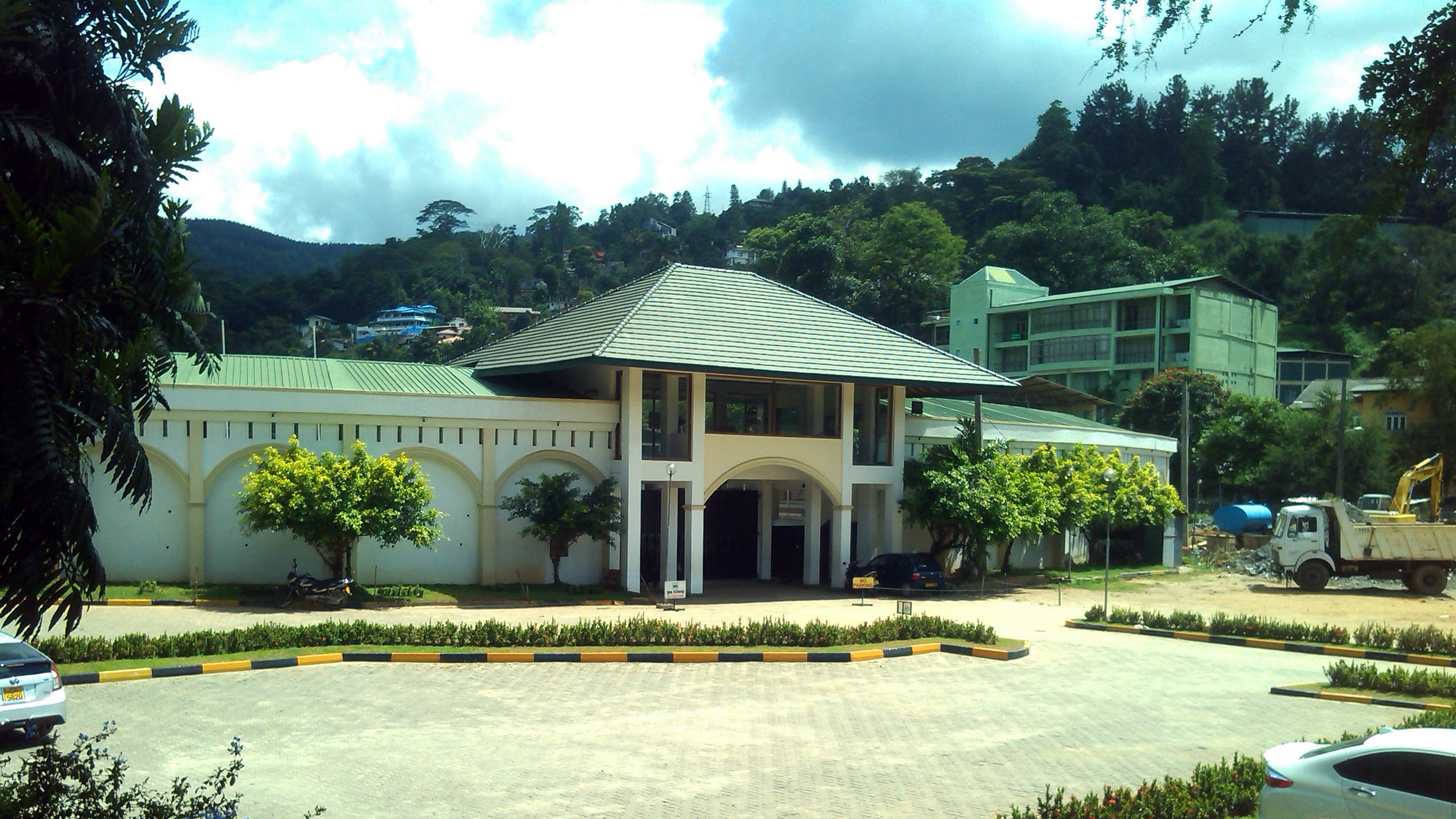
Bogambara Stadium

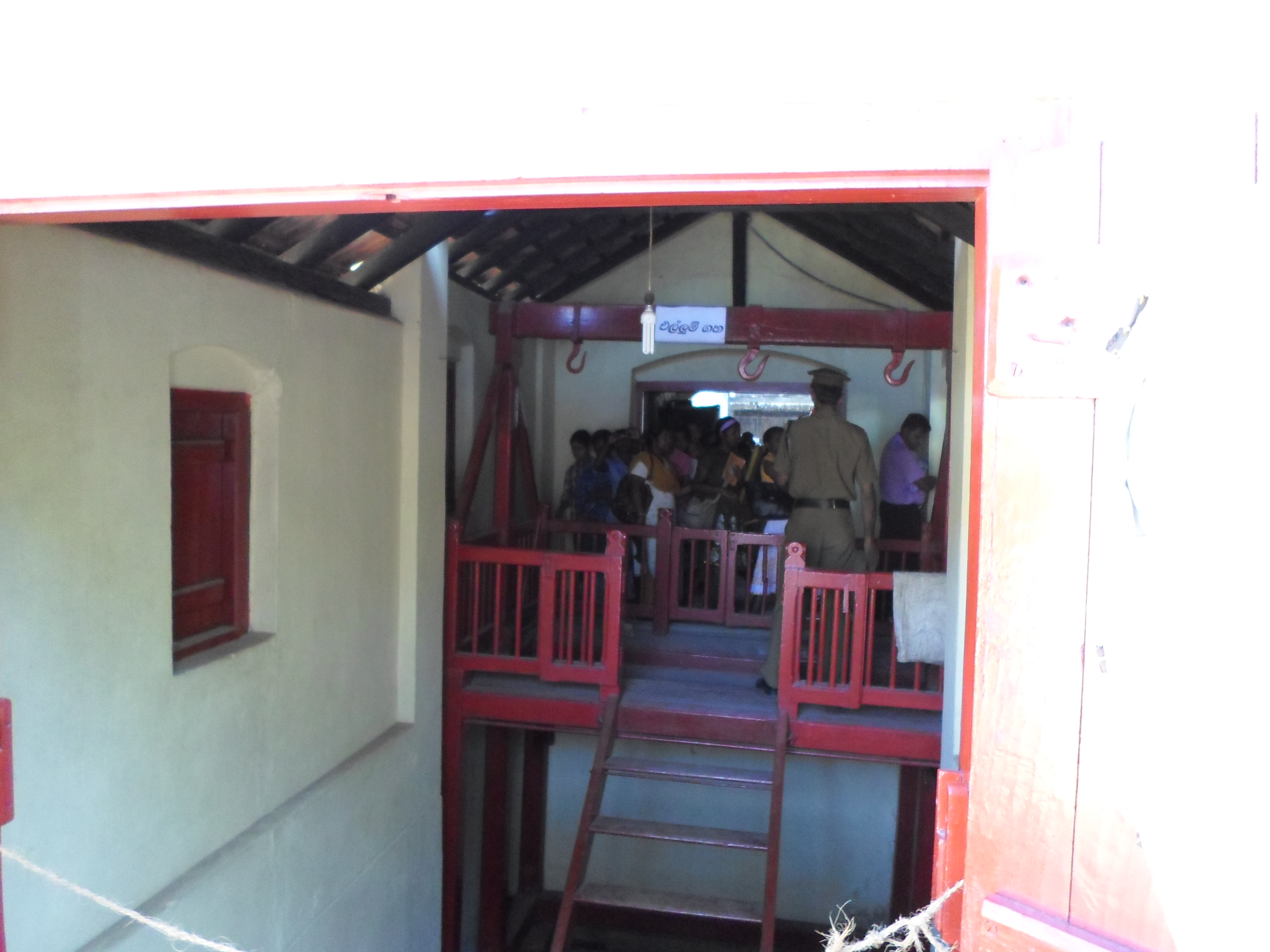
Bogambara Prison

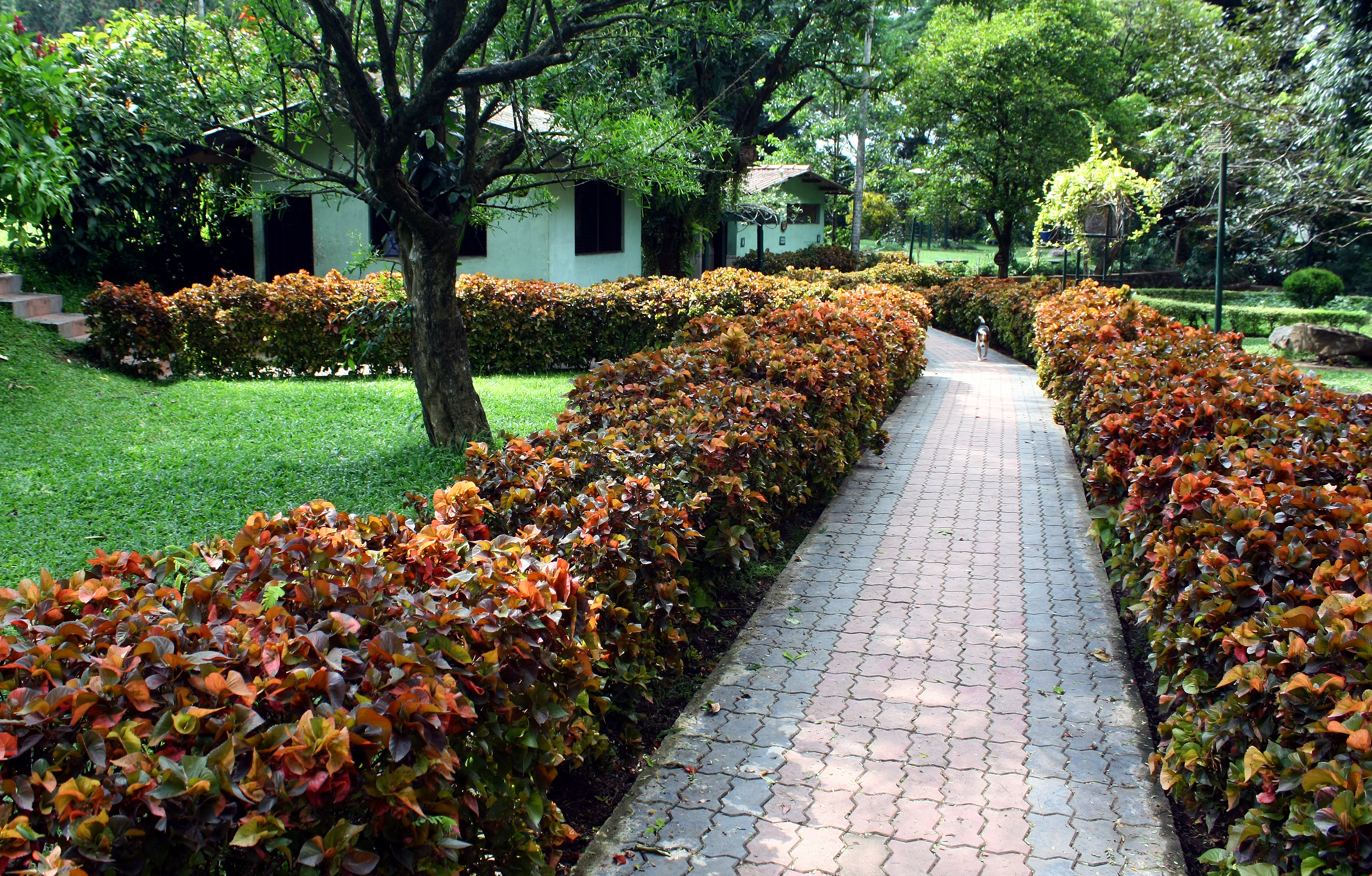
Wales Park

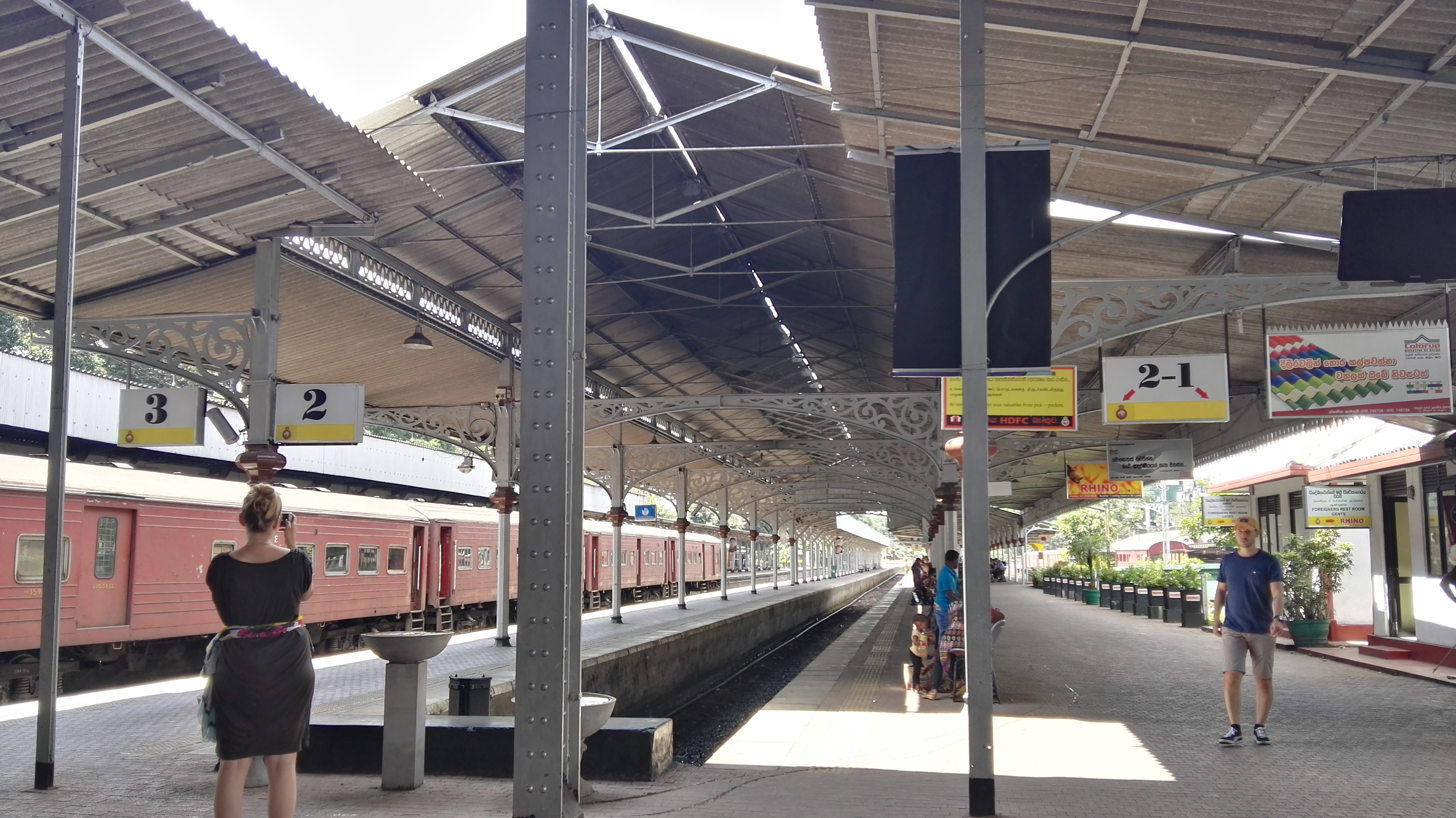
Kandy railway station

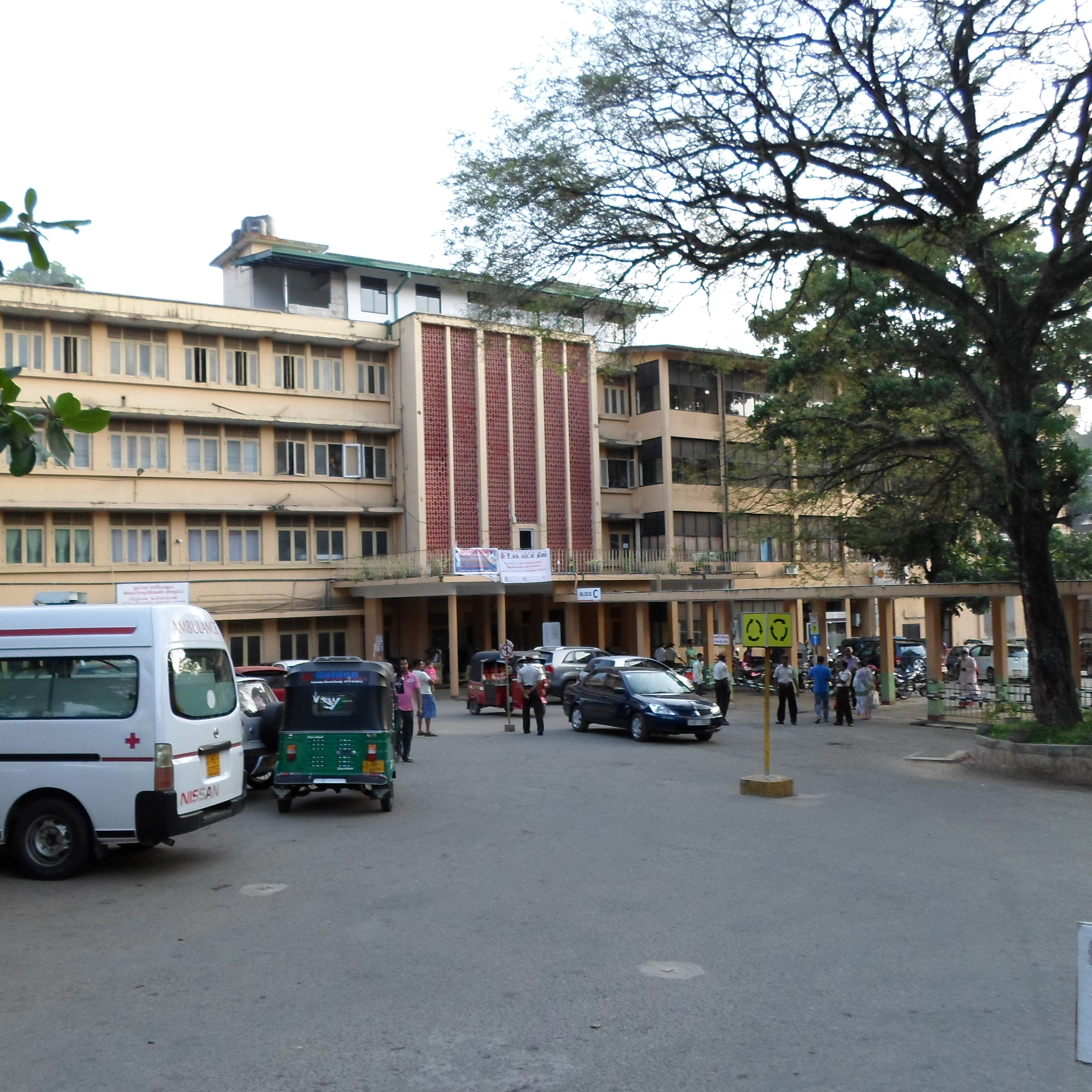
Teaching Hospital, Kandy

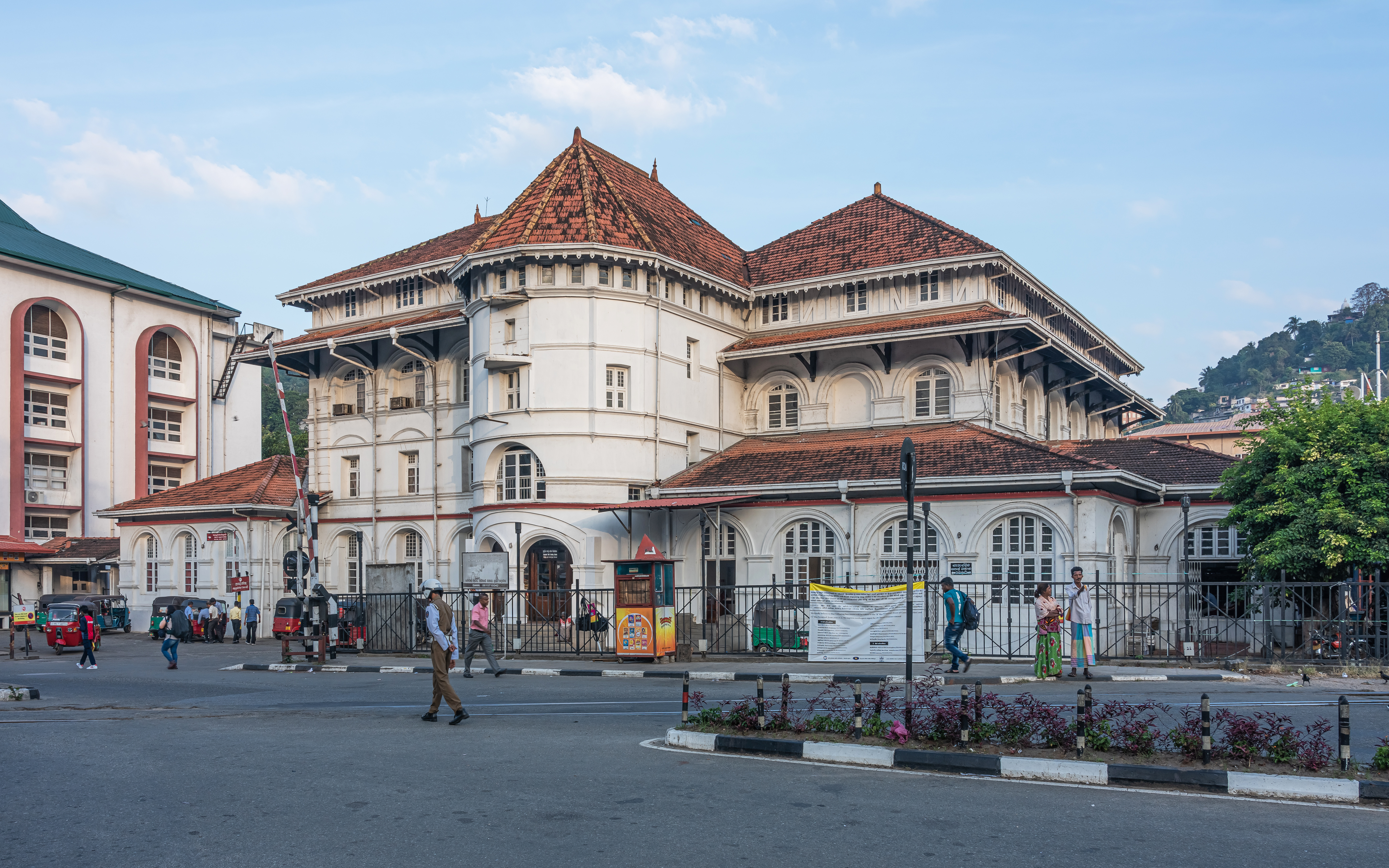
Kandy General Post Office

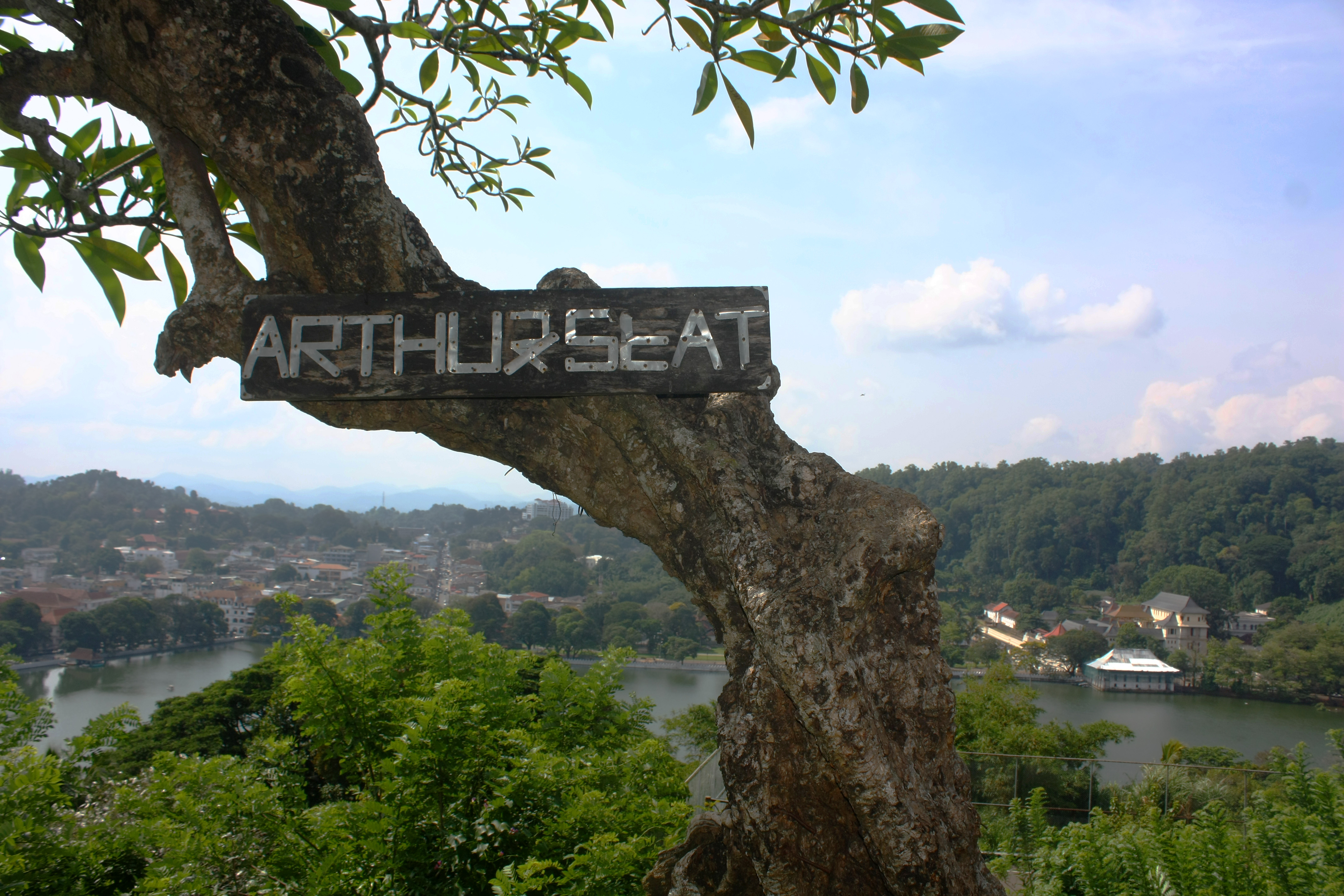
Arthur's Seat, Kandy

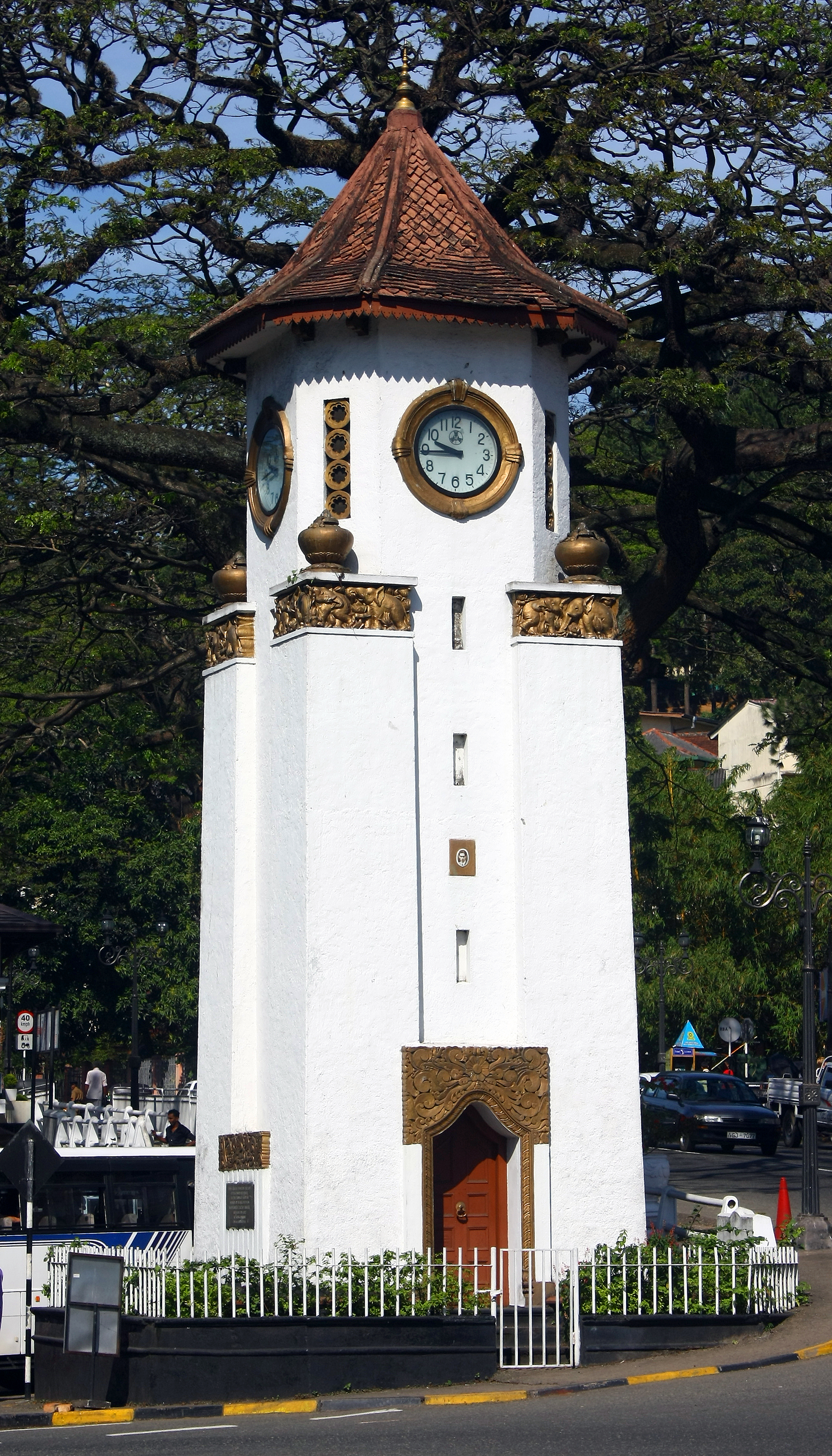
Kandy Clock Tower
