= Wace (surname) =

Wace is a surname. Notable people by that name include:

- Wace (c. 1110 – after 1174), Norman poet
- Alan Wace (1879–1957), English archaeologist
- Barbara Wace (1907–2003), British journalist
- Charles Wace (1961), British businessman
- Henry Wace (footballer) (1853–1947), English international footballer
- Henry Wace (priest) (1836–1924), principal of King's College, London, and Dean of Canterbury
- Herbert Wace (1851–1906), British colonial administrator in Ceylon
- Ian Wace, British financier
- Muriel Wace, English children's book author.
- Nigel Morritt Wace (1929–2005), authority on the plant life of Tristan da Cunha
- Rupert Wace (born 1955), British dealer in antiquities
- Sidney Wace (1882–1966), English army officer and cricketer
- William Wace, 13th-century Irish bishop
