= Round Table =

Table in the Arthurian legend

The Round Table
- Arthurian legend element
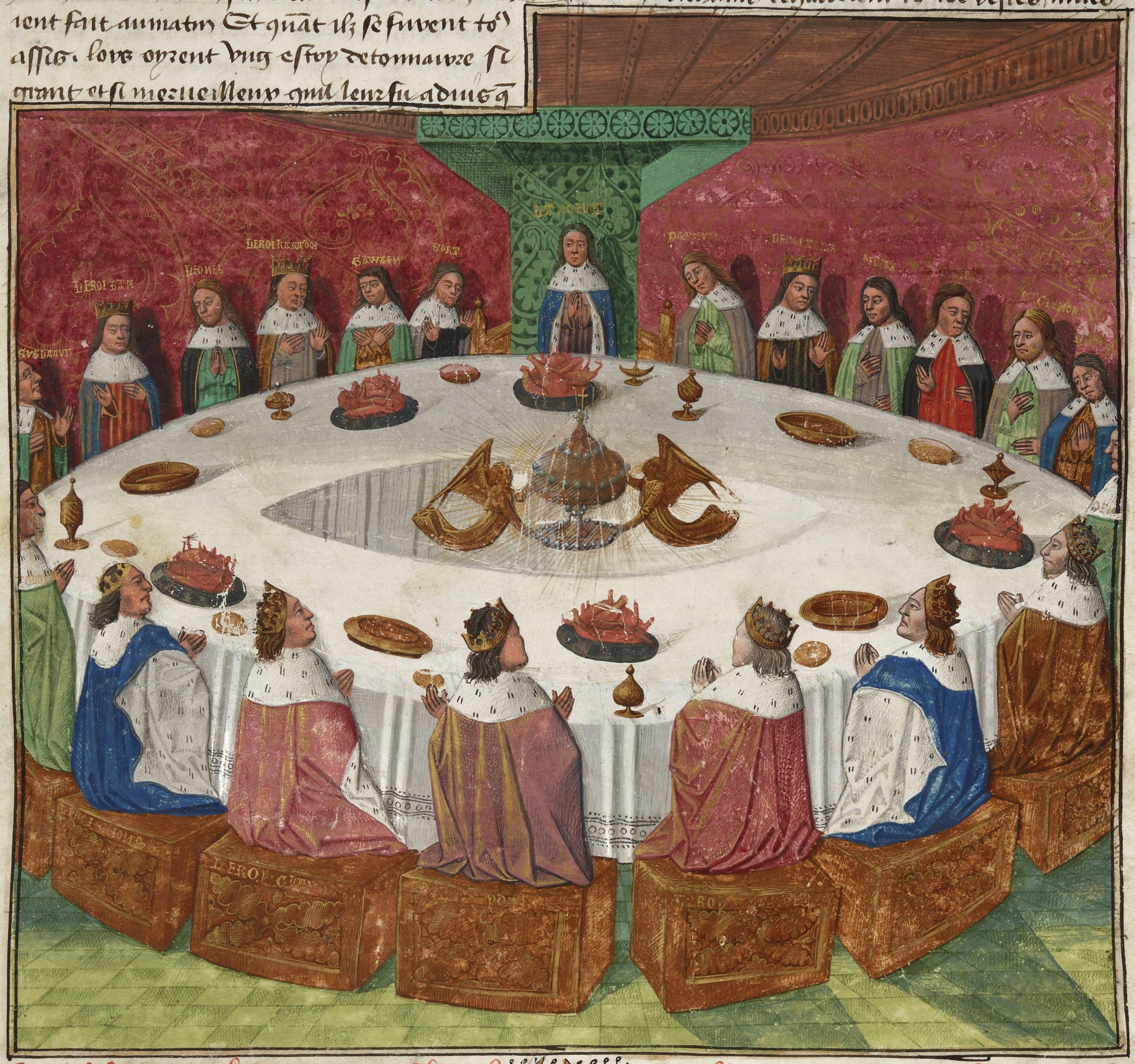
- A 1470 reproduction of Évrard d'Espinques's illumination of the Prose Lancelot, showing King Arthur presiding at the Round Table with his Knights
- First appearance: Roman de Brut; 1155
- Created by: Wace
- Genre: Chivalric romance

In-universe information
- Type: Legendary table
- Owners: King Arthur
- Function: The meeting of Arthur's court, known as the Knights of the Round Table

The Round Table (French: la Table ronde; Welsh: y Ford Gron; Cornish: an Moos Krenn; Breton: an Daol Grenn; Latin: Mensa Rotunda) is King Arthur's famed table in the Arthurian legend, around which he and his knights congregate. As its name suggests, it has no head, implying that everyone who sits there has equal status, unlike conventional rectangular tables where participants order themselves according to rank. The table was first described in 1155 by Wace, who relied on previous depictions of Arthur's fabulous retinue. The symbolism of the Round Table developed over time; by the close of the 12th century, it had come to represent the chivalric order associated with Arthur's court, the Knights of the Round Table.

== Origins ==
Though the Round Table is not mentioned in the earliest accounts, tales of King Arthur having a marvellous court made up of many prominent warriors are ancient. Geoffrey of Monmouth, in his Historia Regum Britanniae (composed c. 1136) says that, after establishing peace throughout Britain, Arthur "increased his personal entourage by inviting very distinguished men from far-distant kingdoms to join it." The code of chivalry so important in later medieval romance figures in it as well, as Geoffrey says Arthur established "such a code of courtliness in his household that he inspired peoples living far away to imitate him."

Arthur's court was well known to Welsh storytellers; in the romance Culhwch and Olwen, the protagonist Culhwch invokes the names of 225 individuals affiliated with Arthur. The fame of Arthur's entourage became so prominent in Welsh tradition that in the later additions to the Welsh Triads, the formula tying named individuals to "Arthur's Court" in the triad titles began to supersede the older "Island of Britain" formula. Though the code of chivalry crucial to later continental romances dealing with the Round Table is mostly absent from the Welsh material, some passages of Culhwch and Olwen seem to reference it. For instance, Arthur explains the ethos of his court, saying "[w]e are nobles as long as we are sought out: the greater the bounty we may give, the greater our nobility, fame and honour."

Though no Round Table appears in the early Welsh texts, Arthur is associated with various items of household furniture. The earliest of these is Saint Carannog's mystical floating altar in that saint's 12th-century Vita. In the story Arthur has found the altar and tries unsuccessfully to use it as a table; he returns it to Carannog in exchange for the saint ridding the land of a meddlesome dragon. Elements of Arthur's household figure into local topographical folklore throughout Britain as early as the early 12th century, with various landmarks being named "Arthur's Seat", "Arthur's Oven", and "Arthur's Bed-chamber".

A henge at Eamont Bridge near Penrith, Cumbria, is known as "King Arthur's Round Table". The still-visible Roman amphitheatre at Caerleon has been associated with the Round Table, and it has been suggested as a possible source for the legend. Following archaeological discoveries at the Roman ruins in Chester, some writers suggested that the Chester Roman Amphitheatre was the true prototype of the Round Table; however, the English Heritage Commission, acting as consultants to a History Channel documentary in which the claim was made, stated that there was no archaeological basis to the story.

== Legend ==
The Round Table first appeared in Wace's Roman de Brut, a Norman language adaptation of Geoffrey's Historia finished in 1155. Wace says Arthur created the Round Table to prevent quarrels among his barons, none of whom would accept a lower place than the others. Layamon added to the story when he adapted Wace's work into the Middle English Brut in the early 13th century, saying that the quarrel between Arthur's vassals led to violence at a Yuletide feast. In response, a Cornish carpenter built an enormous but easily transportable Round Table to prevent further dispute. Wace claims he was not the source of the Round Table; both he and Layamon credited it instead to the Bretons. Some scholars have doubted this claim, while others believe it may be true. There is some similarity between the chroniclers' description of the Round Table and a custom recorded in Celtic stories, in which warriors sit in a circle around the king or lead warrior, in some cases feuding over the order of precedence as in Layamon. There is a possibility that Wace, contrary to his own claims, derived Arthur's round table not from any Breton source, but rather from medieval biographies of Charlemagne—notably Einhard's Vita Caroli and Notker the Stammerer's De Carolo Magno—in which the king is said to have possessed a round table decorated with a map of Rome.

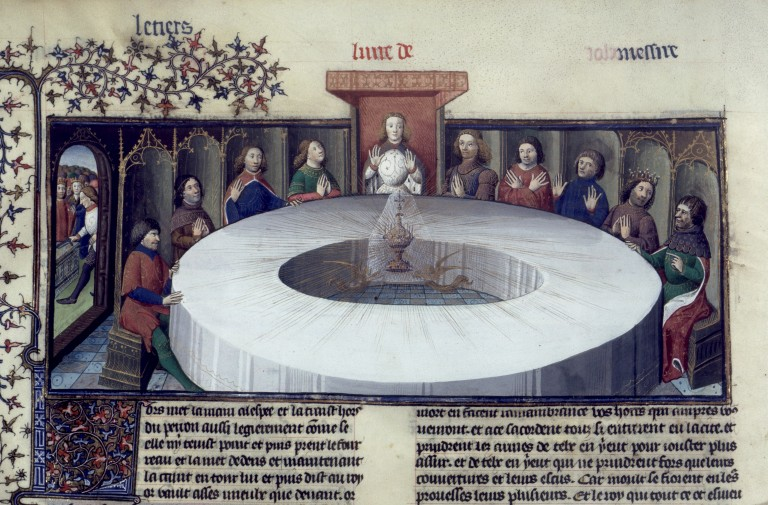
King Arthur's knights, gathered at the Round Table, see a vision of the Holy Grail. From a manuscript of Lancelot and the Holy Grail (c. 1406)

The Round Table takes on new dimensions in the romances of the late 12th and early 13th century, where it becomes a symbol of the famed order of chivalry which flourishes under Arthur. In Robert de Boron's Merlin, written around 1200, the magician Merlin creates the Round Table in imitation of the table of the Last Supper and of Joseph of Arimathea's Grail Table. Made of silver, the Grail Table was used by the followers of Arimathea after he created it as directed by a vision of Christ, and was taken by him to Avalon (later identified with Glastonbury Tor, but this connection was not mentioned by Robert). This version of the Round Table, here made for Arthur's father Uther Pendragon rather than Arthur himself, has twelve seats and one empty place to mark the betrayal of Judas; this seat, must remain empty until the coming of the knight who will achieve the Grail. The Didot Perceval, a prose continuation of Robert's work, takes up the story as the knight Perceval sits in the seat and initiates the Grail quest.

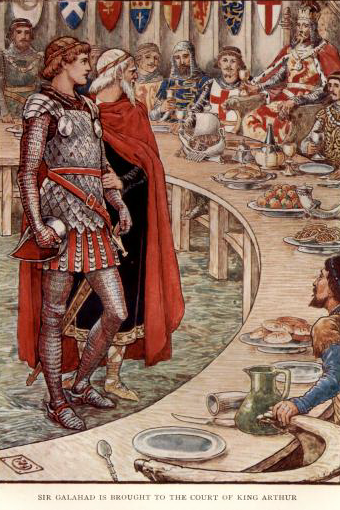
"Sir Galahad is brought to the court of King Arthur", Walter Crane's illustration for King Arthur's Knights, abridged from Le Morte d'Arthur by Henry Gilbert (1911)

The prose cycles of the 13th century, the Lancelot-Grail (Vulgate) Cycle and the Post-Vulgate Cycle, further adapt the chivalric attributes of the Round Table but make it and its fellowship much larger, with many more seats and usually dozens of members at any given time. Here it is the perfect knight Galahad, rather than Percival, who assumes the empty seat, now called the Siege Perilous. Galahad's arrival marks the start of the Grail quest as well as the end of the Arthurian era. In these works the Round Table is kept by King Leodegrance of Cameliard after Uther's death; Arthur inherits it when he marries Leodegrance's daughter Guinevere. Other versions treat the Round Table differently, for instance Arthurian works from Italy like La Tavola Ritonda (The Round Table) often distinguish between the knights of the "Old Table" of Uther's time and those of Arthur's "New Table". In the Post-Vulgate, the Table is eventually destroyed by King Mark during his invasion of Logres after the deaths of Arthur and almost all of the Knights, many of whom in fact had killed each other, especially in internal conflicts at the end of the cycle.

== Round Table tournaments ==
During the Middle Ages, festivals called Round Tables were celebrated throughout Europe in imitation of Arthur's court. These events featured jousting, dancing, and feasting, and in some cases attending knights assumed the identities of Arthur's entourage.

== Winchester Round Table ==
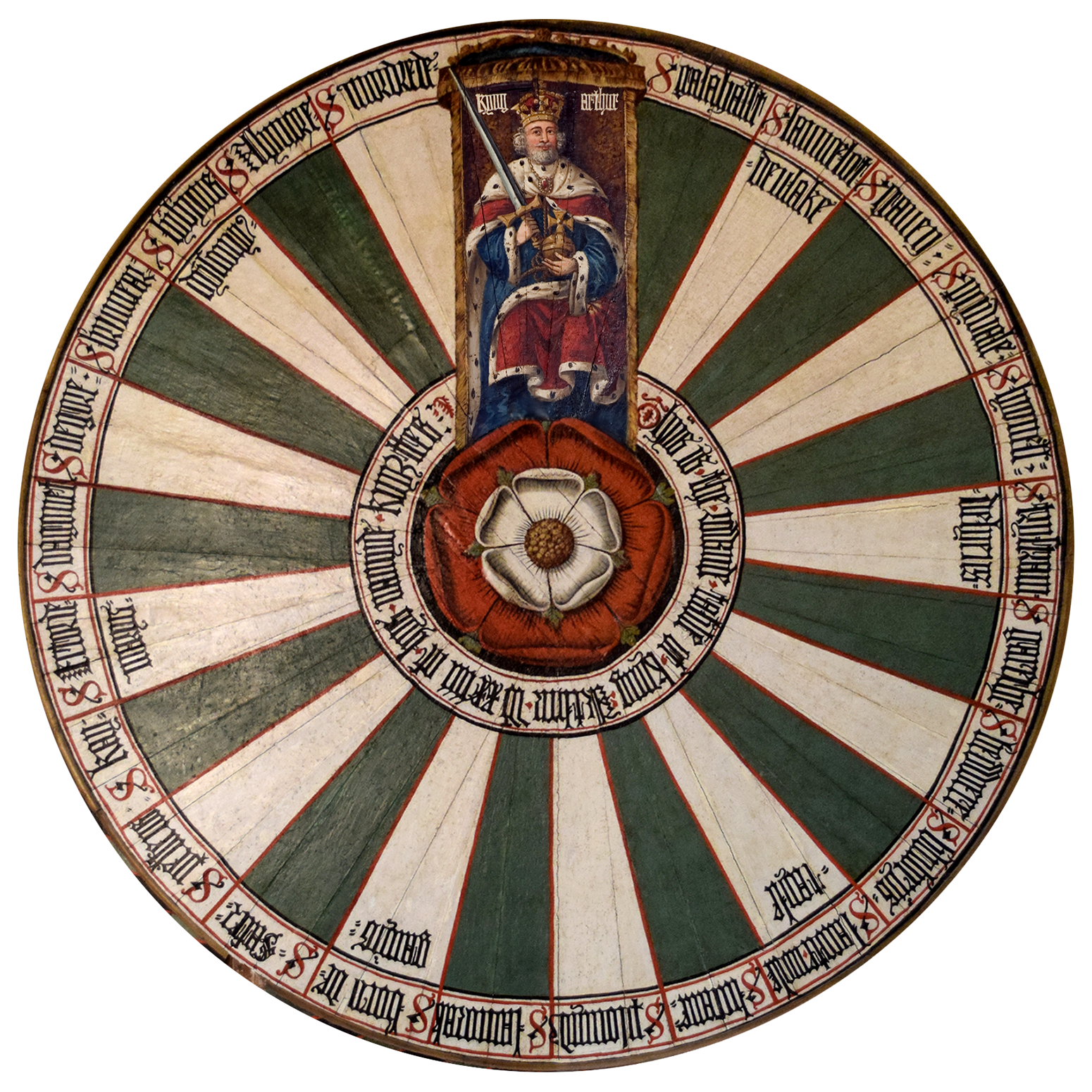
The Winchester Round Table featuring the names of S galahallt (Sir Galahad), S launcelot deulake (Sir Lancelot de Lake), S gauen (Sir Gawain), S pcyvale (Sir Percival), S Iyonell (Sir Lionel), S trystram delyens (Sir Tristan de Lyoness), S garethe (Sir Gareth), S bedwere (Sir Bedivere), S blubrys (Sir Bleoberis), S lacotemale tayle (Sir La Cote Male Taile), S lucane (Sir Lucan), S plomyd (Sir Palamedes), S lamorak (Sir Lamorak), S bors de ganys (Sir Bors de Ganis), S safer (Sir Safir), S pelleus (Sir Pelleas), S kay (Sir Kay), S Ectorde marys (Sir Ector de Maris), S dagonet (Sir Dagonet), S degore (Sir Degore), S brumear (Sir Brunor), S lybyus dyscovy (Sir Le Bel Inconnu), S alynore (Sir Alymore), and S mordrede (Sir Mordred)

The Winchester Round Table is a large tabletop hanging in Winchester Castle and bearing the names of various knights of Arthur's court, was probably created for a Round Table tournament. The table is 5.5 metres (18 ft) in diameter and weighs 1.2 tonnes (2,600 lb). The current paintwork is late; it was done by order of King Henry VIII of England. The table itself is considerably older; dendrochronology calculates the date of construction to 1250–1280—during the reign of Edward I of England—using timbers that were felled over a period of years. Edward was an Arthurian enthusiast who attended at least five Round Tables and hosted one himself in 1299, which may have been the occasion for the creation of the Winchester Round Table. Martin Biddle, from an examination of Edward's financial accounts, links it instead with a tournament King Edward held near Winchester on 20 April 1290, to mark the betrothal of one of his daughters. The green and white colours represents the Welsh Livery used by the Tudor dynasty.

== Historical Round Table of Edward III ==
On 22 January 1344, after a tournament at Windsor Castle, King Edward III of England (r. 1327–1377) swore an oath to restore the Order of the Round Table to the same as that of King Arthur. Receiving agreement from the earls and knights present, Edward announced that the order's first meeting would take place during Pentecost. The plan never came to fruition, but the new Order of the Garter carried connotations from this legend by the circular shape of the garter. Edward's wartime experiences during the Crécy campaign (1346–1347) seem to have been a determining factor in his abandonment of the Round Table project. It has been argued that the total warfare tactics employed by the English at Crécy in 1346 were contrary to Arthurian chivalric ideals and made Arthur a problematic paradigm for Edward, especially at the time of the institution of the Garter. There are no formal references to King Arthur and the Round Table in the surviving early 15th-century copies of the Statutes of the Garter. However, the Garter Feast of 1358 did involve a Round Table game in an overlap between the projected Round Table fellowship and the actualized Order of the Garter.

== General and cited references ==
- Bromwich, Rachel (2006). Trioedd Ynys Prydein: The Triads of the Island of Britain. University Of Wales Press. ISBN 0-7083-1386-8.
- Geoffrey of Monmouth; Thorpe, Lewis (1988). The History of the Kings of Britain. New York: Penguin. ISBN 0-14-044170-0.
- Lacy, Norris J. (ed.) (1991). The New Arthurian Encyclopedia. New York: Garland. ISBN 0-8240-4377-4.
- Loomis, Roger S. (1959). "Arthurian Influence on Sport and Spectacle". Arthurian Literature in the Middle Ages. Oxford.
- Padel, O. J. (2000). Arthur in Medieval Welsh Literature. University of Wales Press. ISBN 0-7083-1689-1.
- Rouse, Robert; and Cory Rushton (2005). The Medieval Quest for Arthur. Tempus, Stroud. ISBN 0-7524-3343-1.
- Thomas, Charles (1953). "Folklore from a Northern Henge Monument". Folklore. 64 (3): 427–429. doi:10.1080/0015587x.1953.9717383. JSTOR 1256826.
