= Toogood =

Toogood is a surname. Notable people with the surname include:

- Alfred Toogood (1872–1928), English golfer
- Bonnie Toogood (born 1997), Australian rules footballer
- Charlie Toogood (1927–1997), American football player
- Faye Toogood (born 1977), British designer
- Giles Toogood (born 1961), English cricketer
- Jon Toogood (born 1971), frontman of New Zealand rock band Shihad
- Laura Toogood (born 1984), British writer, academic and equestrian
- Peter Toogood (1930–2019), Australian golfer
- Selwyn Toogood (1916–2001), New Zealand radio and television personality
- Ted Toogood (1924–2011), Canadian football player
- Thomas Toogood (1872–1953), English cricketer
- Walter Toogood (1874–1914), English golfer

== See also ==
- Mount Toogood, a mountain of Victoria Land, Antarctica
