= 1903 Birthday Honours =

Celebration of the birthday of King Edward VII

The 1903 Birthday Honours were announced on 9 November 1903, to celebrate the birthday of King Edward VII that day. The list included appointments to various orders and honours of the United Kingdom and the British Empire.

The list was published in The Times 9 November 1903, and the various honours were gazetted in The London Gazette on 6 November 1903 and 17 November 1903.

The recipients of honours are displayed here as they were styled before their new honour, and arranged by honour and where appropriate by rank (Knight Grand Cross, Knight Commander, etc.) and then divisions (Military, Civil).

== Baronet ==
- Colonel John Edward Bingham
- Lees Knowles, Esq., MP

== Knight Bachelor ==
- John George Craggs, Esq.
- Robert Kennaway Douglas, Esq., British Museum
- Ernest Francis Swan Flower, Esq., MP
- Professor Clement Le Neve Foster, FRS
- Henry Alexander Giffard, Esq., KC, Bailiff of Guernsey
- Charles Holroyd, Esq., Keeper of the Tate Gallery
- John Macdonell, Esq., CB, Master in the Supreme Court
- Alan Reeve Manby, Esq., MVO
- August Friedrich Manns, Esq., Musical Director of the Crystal Palace
- Harry Simon Samuel, Esq., MP
- Charles Scarisbrick, Esq.
- His Honour Judge Snagge
- William H. Venables Vernon, Esq., Bailiff of Jersey

British Empire

- The Honourable Francis Bathurst Suttor, President of the Legislative Council of the State of New South Wales
- Edward Dundas Holroyd, Esq., Puisne Judge and Senior Member of the Supreme Court Bench of the State of Victoria
- Nathaniel Nathan, Esq., on retirement as Attorney-General of the Colony of Trinidad and Tobago
- Henry Katz Davson, Esq., Deputy Chairman of the West India Committee, and formerly Member of the Court of Policy of the Colony of British Guiana

== The Most Honourable Order of the Bath ==
=== Knight Grand Cross of the Order of the Bath (GCB) ===
Military Division

- Admiral Sir Cyprian Arthur George Bridge, KCB.

=== Knight Commander of the Order of the Bath (KCB) ===
Military Division

- Admiral Algernon Frederick Rous de Horsey.
- Admiral Albert Hastings Markham.
- Vice-Admiral John Fellowes, CB.
- Vice-Admiral the Lord Charles Beresford, KCVO, CB.

=== Companion of the Order of the Bath (CB) ===
Civil Division

- Thomas Little Heath, Esq., Treasury.
- Colonel Duncan Alexander Johnston, RE, Director-General of Ordnance Survey, Southampton.
- Robert Sidney Mitford, Esq., Commissioner of Prisons.
- Thomas Pitts, Esq., Assistant Secretary, Local Government Board.
- Charles Sandiford, Esq., Principal Engineer of the Uganda Railway.
- Hubert Llewellyn Smith, Esq., Board of Trade.
- Windham Henry Wyndham-Quin, Esq., DSO, MP.

== Order of Saint Michael and Saint George ==
=== Knight Commander of the Order of St Michael and St George (KCMG) ===
- The Honourable Augustus Charles Gregory, CMG, formerly Surveyor General of Queensland, Member of the Legislative Council.

=== Companion of the Order of St Michael and St George (CMG) ===
- The Honourable Henry Bruce Lefroy, Agent General for the State of Western Australia.
- The Honourable Justin Fox Greenlaw Foxton, Member of the Legislative Assembly of the State of Queensland, and late Secretary for Public Lands.
- Herbert Wace, Esq., Government Agent of the Central Province of the Island of Ceylon.
- Colonel Louis-Félix Pinault, Deputy-Minister of Militia and Defence of the Dominion of Canada.
- Leslie Probyn, Esq., Secretary to the Government of the Protectorate of Southern Nigeria.
- James Allwood, Esq., Collector-General of Customs, Excise, and Internal Revenue of the Island of Jamaica.
- Thomas Herbert Kershaw, Esq., late Legal Adviser, Federated Malay States.
- Charles Henry Ommanney, Esq., Solicitor to the Crown Agents for the Colonies.
- Major James Deane, Military Secretary to the Governor and Commander-in-Chief of the Colony of the Cape of Good Hope.
- Louis-Philippe Hébert, Esq., Artist and Sculptor, Dominion of Canada.

== Royal Victorian Order ==
=== Knight Grand Cross of the Royal Victorian Order (GCVO) ===
- Richard George Penn, Earl Howe, Lord Chamberlain to Her Majesty Queen Alexandra.

=== Knight Commander of the Royal Victorian Order (KCVO) ===
- General Lord William Frederick Ernest Seymour, Lieutenant of the Tower of London.
- Algernon Bertram Freeman-Mitford, Baron Redesdale, CVO, CB. (Received the honour of Knighthood.)
- Lieutenant-General Arthur Lyttelton Lyttelton-Annesley, Colonel of the 11th (Prince Albert's Own) Hussars. (Received the honour of Knighthood.)

=== Commander of the Royal Victorian Order (CVO) ===
- John Savile Lumley-Savile, Baron Savile.
- Commander Sir Allen William Young, CB, RNR (Retd.)
- Colonel Douglas Haig, CB, Aide-de-Camp to His Majesty the King.
- Lieutenant-Colonel Charles Arthur Andrew Frederick, MVO (Coldstream Guards). Deputy-Master of the Household and Extra Equerry to His Majesty the King.

=== Member of the Royal Victorian Order, 4th class (MVO) ===
- Captain William Webster, MVO (Fifth Class), Clerk Comptroller in the Lord Steward's Department.
- Arthur Abraham David Sassoon, Esq.
- Colonel Albert Edward Williamson Goldsmid.

For services in securing the safety of His Majesty's Ship Victory when in peril of sinking.

- Captain Thomas James Henry Rapson, Royal Navy, Staff Captain of Portsmouth Dockyard.
- William Henry Gard, Esq., Royal Navy, Chief Constructor of Portsmouth Dockyard.

On the occasion of the Presentation of Colours by Her Majesty Queen Alexandra, on behalf of His Majesty, to the 2nd Battalion Highland Light Infantry.

- Lieutenant-Colonel Carteret Walter Carey.

Honorary Member

- Corvetten-Capitan Rudolf Hitter von Benigni in Müldenberg (Austrian Navy). Attached to Lord Methuen's special mission to Vienna.

=== Member of the Royal Victorian Order, 5th class (MVO) ===
- John Michie, Esq., His Majesty's Factor at Balmoral.

On the occasion of the Presentation of Colours by Her Majesty Queen Alexandra, on behalf of His Majesty, to the 2nd Battalion Highland Light Infantry.

- Lieutenant Henry Balfour Fergusson Bryant.
- Lieutenant Lionel Graham Pringle.
