= Wace (disambiguation) =

Wace (c. 1110–1174) was a Medieval Norman poet.

Wace or WACE may also refer to:

- WACE (AM), a radio station (730 AM) licensed to Chicopee, Massachusetts
- Wace (surname), a list of people with the surname Wace
- Western Australian Certificate of Education, an education credential in Western Australia
