= Royal High School, Bath =

Girls' public school in Bath, Somerset, England

Royal High School Bath

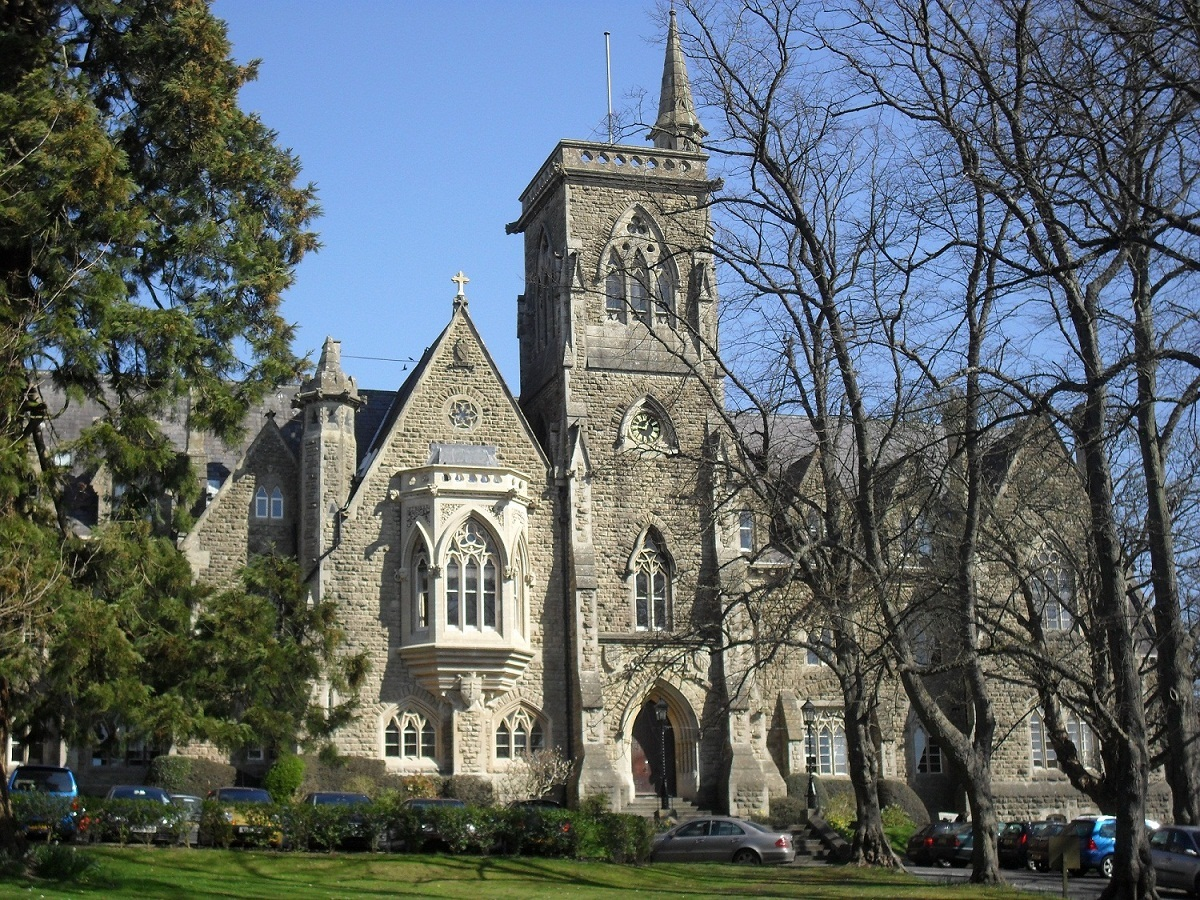
- Front view of Royal High School

Location
- Lansdown Road; Bath, Somerset, BA1 5SZ; England; 51.3977°N 2.3654°W

Information
- Former names: The Royal School; Bath High School
- Type: Private school Boarding and day school
- Religious affiliation: Inter-denominational
- Established: 1998 (merger)
- Local authority: Bath and North East Somerset
- Trust: Girls' Day School Trust (GDST)
- Department for Education URN: 109348 Tables
- Head teacher: Heidi-Jayne Boyes (Note: Since January 2025)
- Gender: Girls
- Age: 9 to 18
- Enrolment: 607 (2024)
- Capacity: 940
- Houses: Du Pré; Wollstonecraft; Brontë; Austen
- Colour
- Website: www.royalhighbath.gdst.net

Royal High School Bath is a private day and boarding school for girls located in Bath, Somerset, England. Established in 1998 from the merger of two schools, the Royal School (founded in 1864) and Bath High School (founded in 1875), it enrols approximately 450 students across Senior and Sixth Form levels. The school has one campus, on Lansdown Road in Bath.

Royal High School Bath is a member of the Girls' Day School Trust (GDST), the UK's largest network of independent girls' schools, and is the only GDST school offering boarding. Its facilities include extensive arts, sports, and music programmes, including the renowned Steinway Music School.

== History ==
=== Founding and merger ===
The school traces its origins to the Bath and Lansdown Proprietary College, a boys' day school founded in 1856 under the patronage of the Duke of Beaufort and the Marquess of Lansdowne, with the Reverend S. H. Widdrington as chairman. In 1864, the school closed and the building was bought, with the support of Queen Victoria, to establish the Royal School for Daughters of Officers of the Army, in order to educate orphaned daughters of Army officers in response to the needs that arose after the Crimean War. The first lady superintendent was recommended by Florence Nightingale.

The Royal School officially reopened on 24 August 1865, and was modelled after the Royal Naval School for girls, a boarding school founded in 1840. During World War II, the Royal School temporarily relocated to the Longleat Estate, where it remained for eight years.

Bath High School for Girls was founded in September 1875 at Portland Place in Lansdown by the Girls’ Public Day School Company (now the Girls' Day School Trust), the largest network of independent girls’ schools in the UK. Its mission was to provide high-quality, accessible education for girls in Bath and the surrounding area, contributing to the development of girls' education within the region.

In 1998, these two institutions merged to create the Royal High School Bath (RHS). The former Royal School campus became the Senior School, while the former Bath High School site served as the Junior School. Today, Royal High School Bath stands as the only Girls' Day School Trust school that offers boarding facilities.

=== Buildings ===
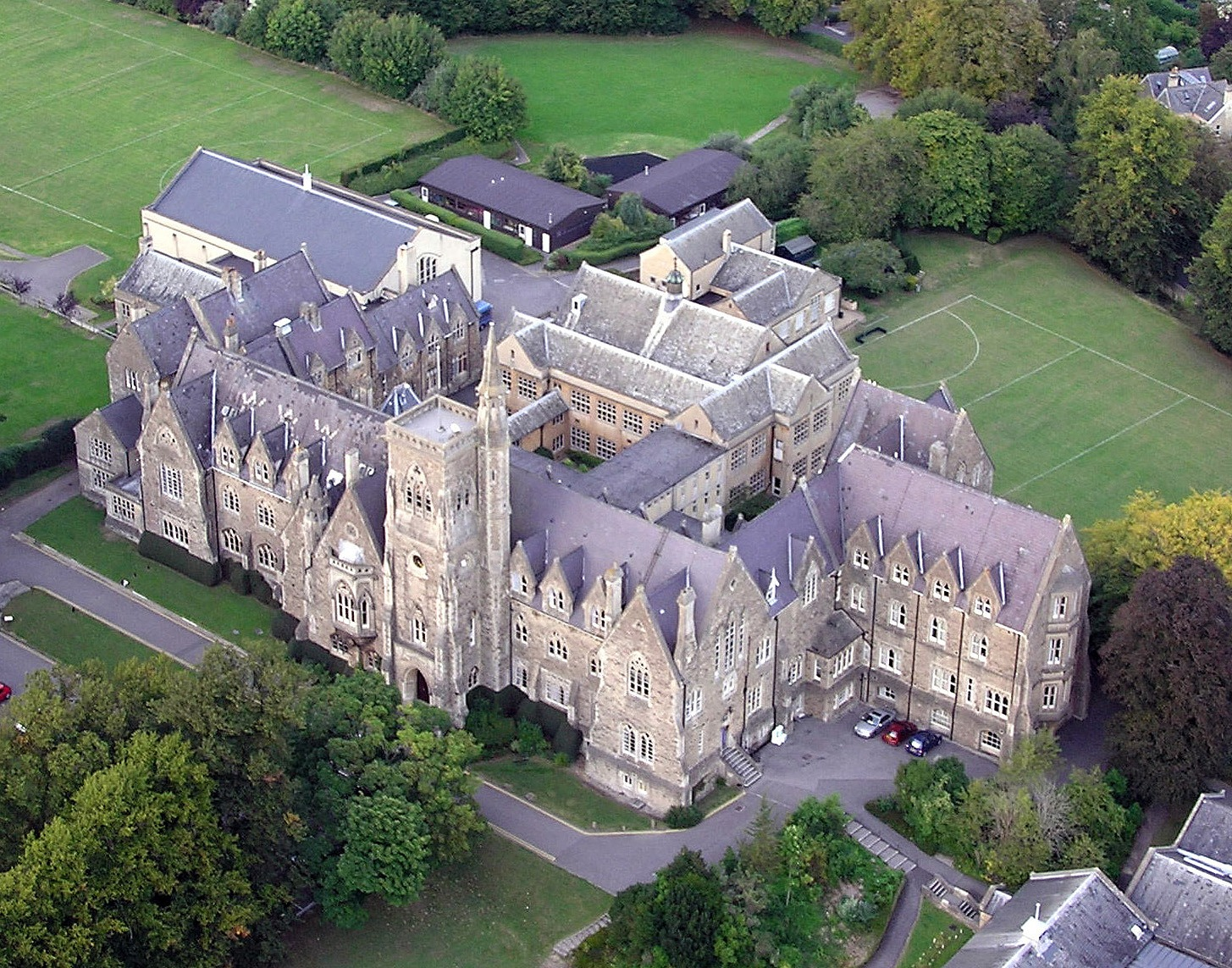
Aerial view of Royal High School

The main building, situated atop Lansdown Road in Bath, was designed by architect James Wilson and completed in 1856, shortly after his design of the Wesleyan College (now Kingswood School). Constructed in the Gothic Revival style, it is designated as a Grade II listed building. The structure houses the Senior School and the Winfield Centre for sixth form students.

Other Grade II listed structures are the entrance arch with royal arms on Lansdown Road (c.1858, also by Wilson); steps and lamp standards at the main building entrance (1858 or 1880s); the former sanatorium in the grounds, now houses (1884); and the school chapel (1939, designed by H.S. Goodhart-Rendel in a stripped Gothic style with Tudor detailing). The former Prep School was at Cranwell House, a Grade II listed Victorian mansion in Weston Park.

== Academics ==
Royal High School Bath is consistently ranked among the top schools in Bath for GCSE and A-Level results and is frequently recognised by The Sunday Times as one of the best independent secondary schools in the southwest of England. The school received an 'excellent' rating for academic achievement and personal development from the Independent Schools Inspectorate (ISI) in 2016, with a 2024 inspection confirming compliance with all required standards.

The school offers a broad range of GCSE subjects, including STEM options such as sciences, computer science, and design technology, alongside languages like French, German, Italian, Mandarin, and Spanish. Latin is studied by all students from Year 7. In 2023, 65.4 percent of GCSE grades were awarded at 9–7. In 2024, 67% of GCSE grades were 9–7 (A*-A). In 2025, 68 percent of GCSE entries were awarded grades 9–7 (A*-A).

In the sixth form, students choose between A-Levels and the International Baccalaureate (IB) Diploma Programme. A-Level options include classical civilisation, economics, Mandarin, music, fine art, psychology, religion and philosophy, and physical education. In 2023, 42.2 percent of A level grades were awarded at A*–A. In 2024, 43 percent of A level grades were at A*–A with 76% achieving grades A*–B. In 2025, 40 percent of A level entries were awarded grades A*–A.

RHS has a strong record in the IB Diploma Programme, consistently exceeding global averages. In 2018, it was recognised as the UK’s top-performing school for IB results, with an average score of 39. Subsequent averages included 38.6 in 2020, and 40 in 2021, compared to a global average of 32.99 that year. In 2024, the IB cohort achieved a 100% pass rate, with an average score of 36. In 2025 the IB cohort achieved a 100% pass rate with average score of 40.3 points out of 45.

== Facilities and resources ==
The Art Department is housed in the Art School, which was inaugurated in November 2008 by Professor Sir Christopher Frayling, then Rector of the Royal College of Art and Chairman of the Arts Council, England. It includes four dedicated studios, supporting activities such as painting, sculpture, printmaking, film, and photography. The Drama Department utilises the school's two performance venues: the Memorial Hall, a traditional space with movable seating, and the Sophie Cameron Performing Arts Centre, a versatile area in the former school chapel.

In 2020, RHS became one of 250 schools worldwide to achieve the prestigious Steinway School status. The purpose-built Music School comprises a main teaching room, eight sound-proofed practice rooms, a contemporary recital space, 10 Steinway & Sons pianos, two professional-standard recording studios and a control room equipped with an Audient ASP8024 Heritage Edition mixing console. As part of the department's Steinway Music School status, a regular programme of masterclasses and recitals led by leading artists is offered. The Music Department produces 35 concerts during the academic year.

The school's sports facilities on the Lansdown campus include an AstroTurf pitch for hockey and football, two multi-use courts for netball and tennis, and a sports hall equipped for netball, basketball and badminton. The school also has access to the University of Bath's Olympic-standard sports facilities, which support student training and competitions.

== Student life ==
Royal High School divides its pupils into four houses: Austen, Brontë, Du Pré and Wollstonecraft. These houses compete in a range of academic and extracurricular activities throughout the year.

Boarding options cater to girls aged 9 to 18, with choices between full boarding, weekday-only boarding, and flexible boarding. Students are accommodated in School House, within the main school building.

== Royal High Nursery & Prep School - Closed July 2026 ==
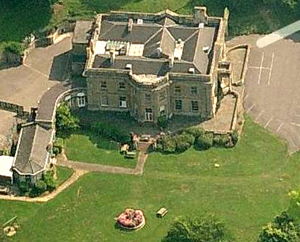
Prep School: Cranwell House

The Royal High Nursery & Prep School was in the Weston area of Bath. Formerly housed in Bath High School on Lansdown Road, it moved in 2014 to Cranwell House, a Grade II listed Victorian mansion. The Nursery was in the adjacent Vine House and Orangery. Hope Hall, behind Cranwell House, had classrooms for Years 5 and 6. The site also featured a sports hall and a dance studio. The school followed the Reggio Emilia approach to education.

In January 2026, the school announced that the Nursery & Prep School would close at the end of the summer term, with pupils in Years 5 and 6 moving to the Senior School. The closure was attributed in part to rising costs linked to recent government policy changes, including the introduction of VAT on school fees, the removal of business rates relief, and increased employer National Insurance contributions.

== Notable alumnae ==
The school's notable alumnae include:

- Dawn Austwick – Chief executive of the Esmée Fairbairn Foundation, and CEO of the Big Lottery Fund (Bath High School).
- Dame Mary Berry – Chef and TV presenter (Bath High School).
- Emily Brooke – Trailblazing inventor and entrepreneur, Founder and Director of Beryl (formerly Blaze) Laser Lights for Bikes.
- Molly Scott Cato – MEP for the South West of England.
- Mary Duggan – Cricketer (Royal School).
- Jennie Formby – Senior official in the Unite trade union and General Secretary of the Labour Party (Bath High School).
- Helen Geake – Archaeologist and key member of Channel 4's archaeology series Time Team.
- Sheila Gish – Actress (Royal School).
- Bunny Guinness – Landscape architect, journalist, and radio personality, regular panellist on BBC Radio 4's Gardener's Question Time (Bath High School).
- Nina Hamnett – Welsh artist and writer, expert on sailors' chanteys, known as the Queen of Bohemia.
- Dawn Harper – Media doctor, presenter of 'Embarrassing Bodies,' and contributor to This Morning and other TV shows.
- Joan Heal – Actress (Bath High School).
- Veronica Henry – Writer of bestselling novels, TV scriptwriter, and journalist.
- Baroness Elspeth Howe – Life-long peer and former chair of the Broadcasting Standards Commission (Bath High School).
- Gillian Howell (1927–2000) – Architect (Royal School).
- June Lloyd, Baroness Lloyd of Highbury – Nuffield Professor of Child Health from 1985 to 1992 at the British Postgraduate Medical Federation, Professor of Child Health from 1975 to 1985 at St George's Hospital Medical School, and President from 1988 to 1991 of the British Paediatric Association (Royal School).
- Myrtle Maclagan – Cricketer (Royal School).
- Sonia Melchett (née Graham) – Socialite and writer (Royal School).
- Iris Morley – Historian (Royal School).
- Penny Mountbatten, Lady Ivar Mountbatten – Businesswoman and philanthropist (Royal School).
- Helen Rollason – BBC Sports Presenter.
- Susan Strange – Economist (Royal School).
- Dame Veronica Sutherland – Career diplomat, served as Ambassador to the Republic of Ireland.
- Laura Toogood – managing director of private clients at Digitalis, speaker on journalism, and researcher in cybersecurity.
- Caroline St John-Brookes – Lecturer and education writer, editor of Times Educational Supplement (1997–2000).
- Barbara Wace – Journalist, the first female reporter to report on D-Day.
- Cicely Williams – physician and researcher in maternal and child health, first Director of Mother and Child Health at WHO in 1948 (Bath High School).
- Cecil Woodham-Smith – Historian and biographer (Royal School).
