= Beryl (company) =

British company making bike lights and bike sharing systems

SMIDSY Limited
- Logo of Beryl

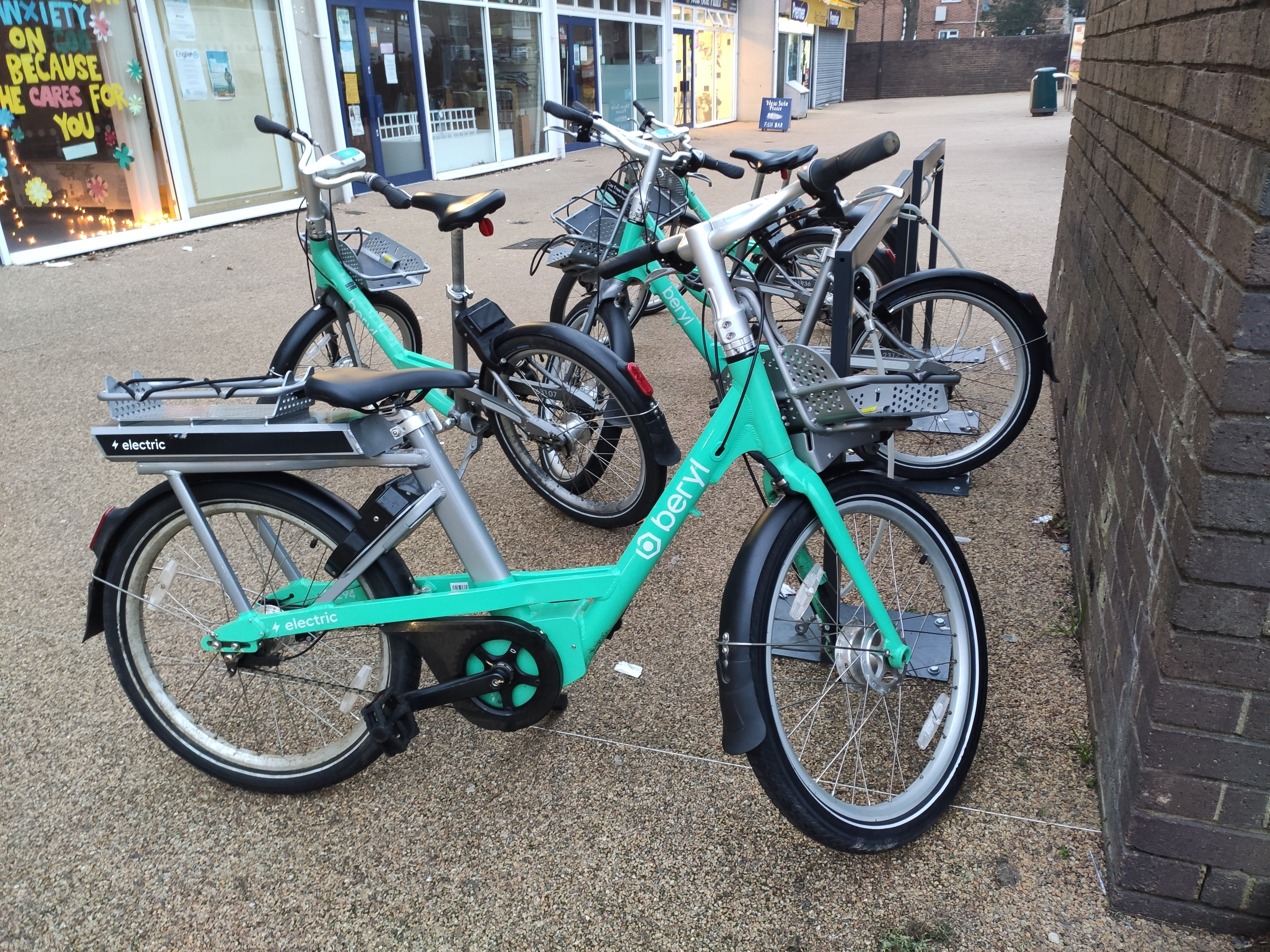
- Beryl electric and conventional bikes in Norwich
- Trade name: Beryl
- Founded: 1 November 2011; 13 years ago in Bath, United Kingdom
- Founder: Emily Brooke
- Headquarters: The Frames, 1 Phipp Street, London, United Kingdom
- Website: beryl.cc

Beryl (a trading name of SMIDSY Limited) is a British company which produces bicycle sharing systems and bicycle lights.

== Company ==
The company's founder, Emily Brooke, initially marketed her lights using the brand "Blaze" but changed to "Beryl", acknowledging champion cyclist Beryl Burton, after a legal challenge from an American bike light company called Blaze. The company was registered in November 2011 with the name SMIDSY (an acronym for "Sorry Mate I Didn't See You", used when motorists fail to notice bicycles or motorbikes). "Beryl" is the trading name of the company.

== Lights ==
Its founder Brooke developed the "Laserlight" bike lights which are now used as part of Santander Cycles, London's public bike hire scheme. This light projects an image of a bicycle, in green, onto the road about 6 metres (20 ft) ahead of the bike, visible round corners and in blind spots. TfL has said that the advantages of the Laserlight are it "can be seen from nearly all angles, helping make drivers and pedestrians aware of any approaching Santander Cycles", which has been shown to "help to increase confidence on the roads by making cyclists feel more visible". The company makes several other brands of light, including the "Pixel" which can be switched between red and white for rear or front use, and the "Laserlight core", a cheaper version of the Laserlight using plastic instead of aluminium for the main body.

== Bicycle-sharing and kicksharing ==
Beryl also runs a dockless cycle sharing scheme, currently implemented in towns and counties including Brighton and Hove; Cornwall; Dorset; Greater Manchester; Hereford; Hertsmere; Isle of Wight; Leeds; Norwich; Plymouth; Portsmouth; Watford; and the West Midlands. In Manchester, for sponsorship reasons, they operate under the name Starling Bank Bikes. In some locations, such as Bournemouth, Christchurch and Poole, Norwich and West Midlands, Beryl Bikes also provides a scooter-sharing system, known as kicksharing.
