= Emily Brooke =

British inventor & entrepreneur (born 1985)

- Years active: 2011–present
- Known for: Beryl Laserlights; Founder of Beryl

Emily Sophie Hastings Brooke MBE (born November 1985) is a British inventor, industrial designer and entrepreneur known for having developed the Beryl (formerly Blaze) Laserlights used for Santander Cycles (the London bike rental scheme).

== Early life and education ==
Brooke attended Royal High School, Bath until 2003. She began a course in physics at the University of Oxford but abandoned it to instead study product design in Brighton.

== Beryl Laserlights ==
Beryl laserlights are bicycle lights which project an image of a bicycle onto the road ahead of the rider, to improve safety by alerting other users when the bicycle is in their blind spot or round a corner. Brooke developed the laser as part of a project in her final year at the University of Brighton and was entered into an entrepreneurship programme in Boston (funded by Santander). After graduating in 2011 she developed the project further by listing the concept on Kickstarter, gaining attention from Transport for London as well as securing funding from the family of Richard Branson. Her firm, Blaze, was then successful in securing support from Santander who now use the lights on all of the bikes within the Santander Cycles scheme. In May 2018, following a lawsuit from a US registered company also with the name Blaze, Brooke changed her company name to Beryl.

She was appointed MBE in the 2017 Birthday Honours; "For Services to the Economy and Transport".

Her company, Beryl, sells the "Laserlight" and a range of other cycle lights, and also operates dockless cycle sharing schemes in several cities around the UK.

== Revent ==
In 2021, Brooke was one of the founding partners of Revent, an early-stage venture capital fund aiming to support "Founders who share our belief that the greatest and most important opportunity is ... to tackle a problem that truly matters".
