= Évrard d'Espinques =

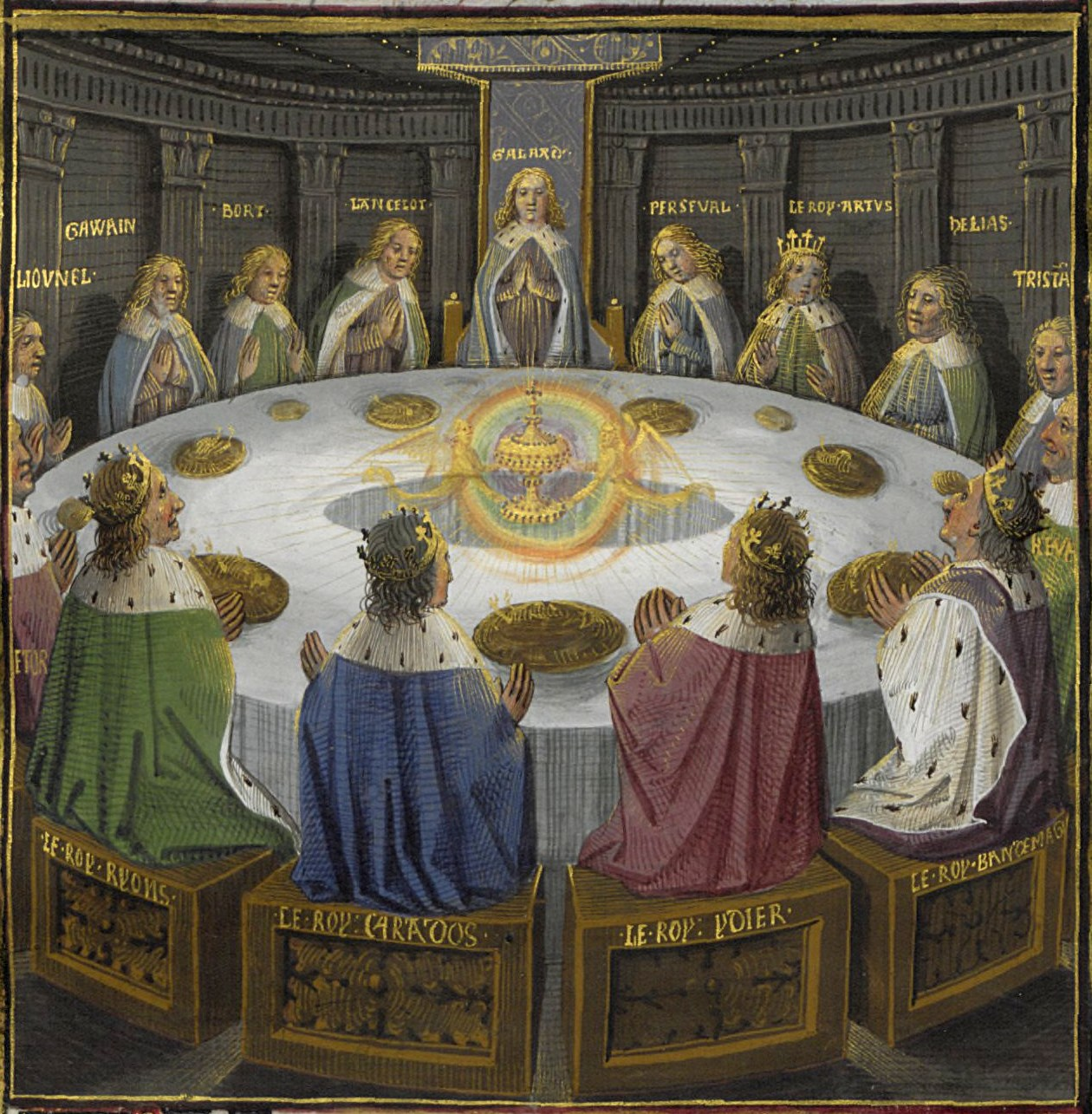
The knights and kings of the Round Table experiencing a vision of the Holy Grail.

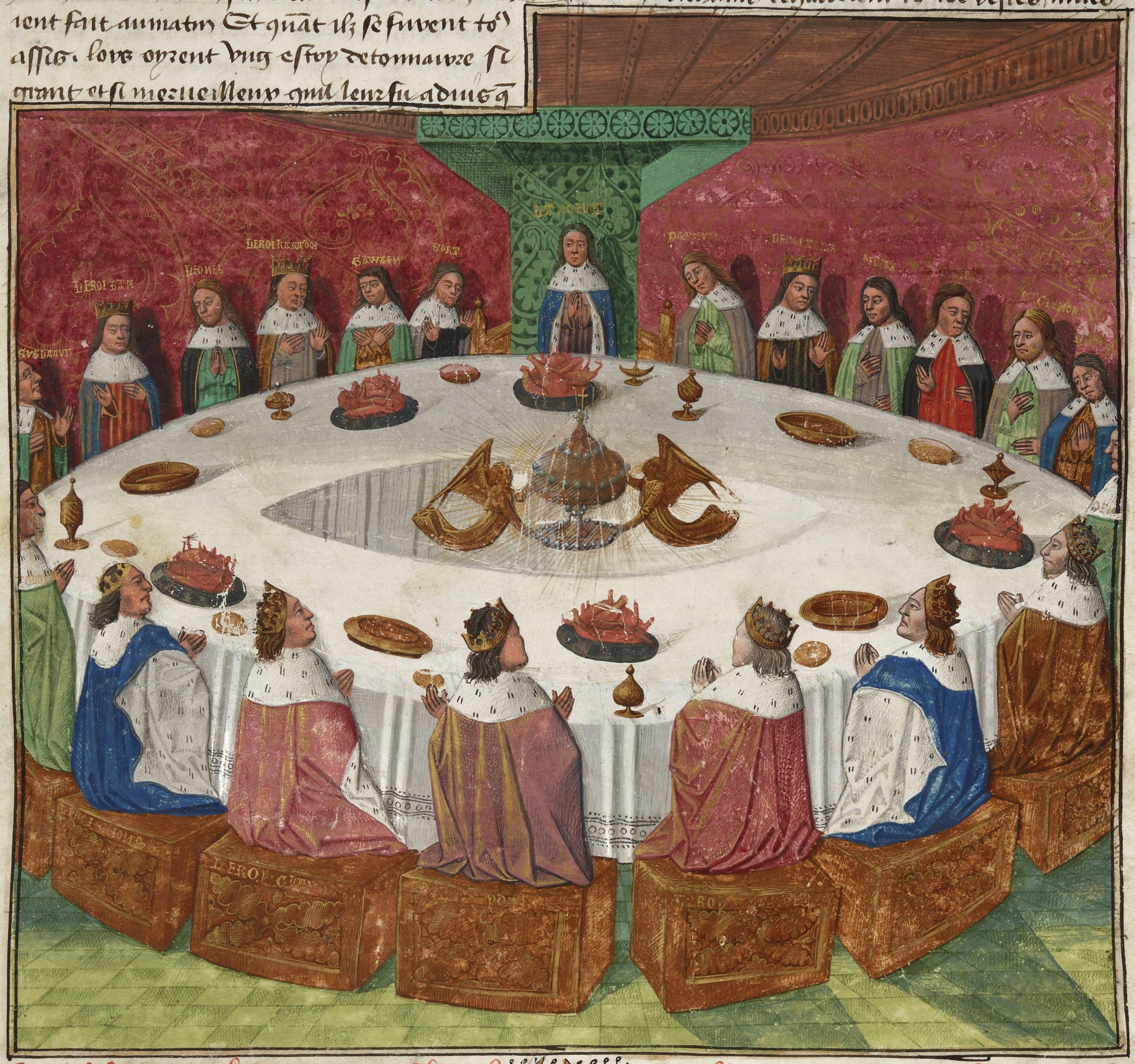
Another version from a different manuscript illuminated by Évrard.

Évrard d'Espinques was a French manuscript illuminator active between 1440 and 1494.
