= Dawn Austwick =

British businesswoman, CEO

Dawn Austwick OBE
- Born: December 1960 (age 65)
- Education: University of London; London Business School
- Title: CEO, Big Lottery Fund
- Spouse: Married
- Children: 3

Dawn Jacquelyn Austwick, OBE (born December 1960) was the chief executive (CEO) of the Big Lottery Fund from October 2014 to 2020.

== Education ==
Austwick was educated at Royal High School, Bath, followed by a bachelor's degree from London University, and an MBA from the London Business School.

== Career ==
After university, Austwick worked in arts sponsorship and fundraising before becoming a management consultant at KPMG. She was then the project director overseeing the opening of Tate Modern. From 2002-2005, Austwick was deputy director of the British Museum. She was chief executive (CEO) of the Esmée Fairbairn Foundation from 2008 to 2014, prior to becoming CEO of the Big Lottery Fund.

== Honours ==
She was awarded an honorary doctorate from London Metropolitan University in 2006.

== Personal life ==
Austwick is married with three children, and lives in north London.
