= Arthur's Seat (disambiguation) =

Arthur's Seat is a mountain peak in Edinburgh, Scotland.

Arthur's Seat may also refer to:

== Places ==
- Arthurs Seat, Victoria, a locality and hill in Mornington Peninsula, Australia
- Arthur Seat (Canada), a summit in the Clear Range in British Columbia, Canada
- Arthur's Seat, a promontory near Shiel Hill, New Zealand
- Arthur's Seat, Kandy, a lookout point in Kandy, Sri Lanka
- Pen y Fan, a peak in South Wales

== Other uses ==
- Arthur's Seat (song), a song from the 2010 album The Illusionist: Music from the Motion Picture

== See also ==
- Arthur point, a point in the hills of Mahabaleshwar, India
