= Kandy Clock Tower =

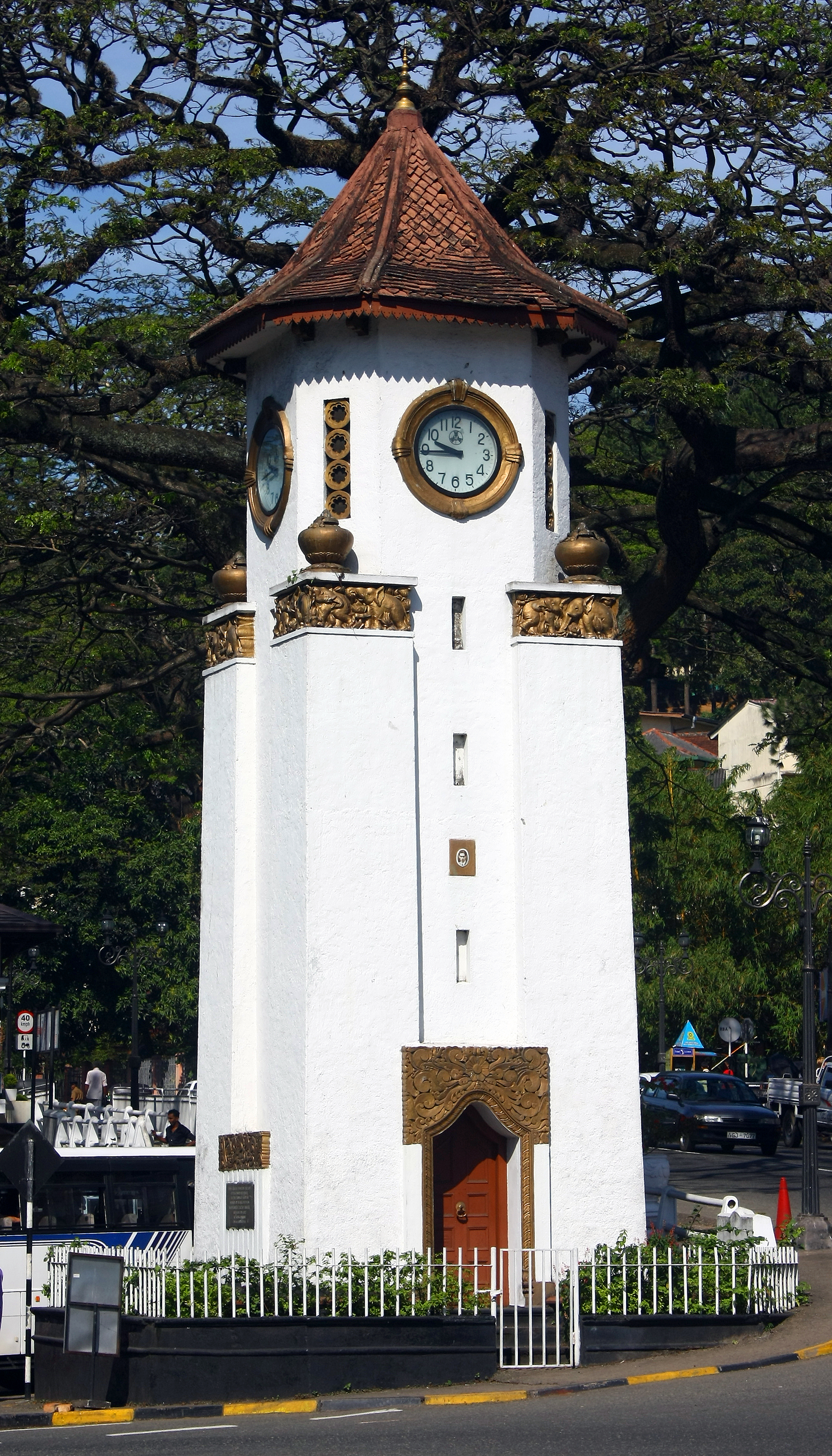
- Front view of the tower
- Interactive map of Kandy Clock Tower
- Location: Kandy, Central Province, Sri Lanka
- Coordinates: 7°17′35″N 80°38′5″E
- Designer: Shirley de Alwis
- Beginning date: 14 August 1950
- Completion date: 23 December 1950
- Opening date: 1951
- Dedicated to: Mohamed Zacky Ismail

The Kandy Clock Tower (Sinhala: මහනුවර ඔරලෝසු කණුව, Tamil: கண்டி மணிக்கூட்டுக் கோபுரம்) is located in the centre of Kandy, Sri Lanka, on the intersections of Sri Dalada Veediya, S. W. R. D. Bandaranaike Mawatha and Hiragedara Mawatha. A landmark of the city, the clock tower was built near to the Ismail Building in 1950 by Haji Mohamed Ismail as a monument and in memory of his son Mohamed Zacky Ismail, who lost his life in an accident in Kadugannawa in August, 1947.

== History ==
Ismail was the agent for Rowlands Limited (who were once the largest importer of British cars in the country). On 14 August 1947 Ismail's son was returning to Kandy from Colombo with his brother-in-law, another employee and the driver when the car was crushed under a boulder that slid down in a continuous rain induced earth slip. The following day Ismail was notified of the accident by police. The land for the tower was acquired by the Kandy Municipal Council, while the machinery and equipment needed was brought over from the United Kingdom. The clock tower was completed on 23 December 1950 although it wasn't officially declared open until the next year, by the then Prime Minister, D.S. Senanayake and the Mayor of Kandy E. L. Senanayake.

== Features ==
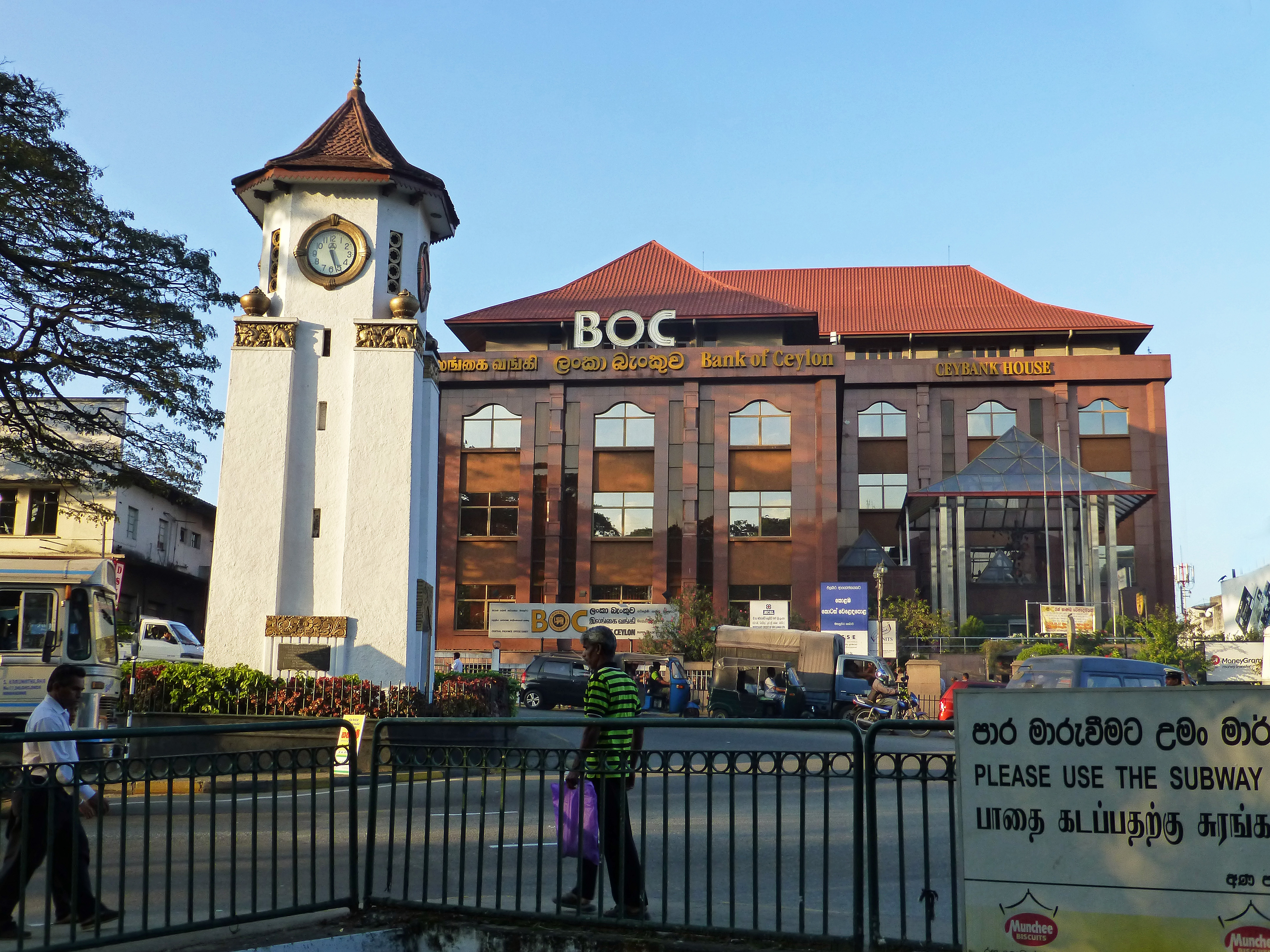
Kandy Clock Tower and Bank of Ceylon Kandy

The Clock Tower was designed by Shirley de Alwis, one of Sri Lanka's leading architects at the time. De Alwis was the local resident architect working with Sir Patrick Abercrombie on the design of the University of Peradeniya campus. The clock tower's design is influenced by the Kandyan style and incorporates elements of the Temple of the Tooth and the palace of the King of Kandy within elements of its facade.

== See also ==
- Koch Memorial Clock Tower
