= Thomas Herbert Kershaw =

British lawyer in British Malaya

Thomas Herbert Kershaw CMG CB
- Born: 1851
- Died: 9 December 1913 (Aged 61)
- Occupation: Lawyer
- Years active: 1879-1902
- Known for: Legal reform in the Federated Malay States

Thomas Herbert Kershaw CMG CB (1851 – 9 December 1913) was a British barrister who acted as the Attorney General of the Straits Settlements, and was appointed as the first Legal Adviser of the newly formed Federated Malay States, at the end of the nineteenth century.

== Early life and education ==
Thomas Herbert Kershaw was born in 1851, son of Rev T. A. Kershaw. He was educated at Trinity College, Oxford, and after graduating was admitted to the Inner Temple as a barrister-at-law in 1876.

== Career ==
In 1879, Kershaw was enrolled as a member of the local bar in Penang, and practised there as a solicitor and advocate for eight years.

In 1887, Kershaw went to Singapore to take up the appointment of Registrar of Deeds, Straits Settlements, and the following year was appointed magistrate. In 1890, he was appointed Official Assignee, and in 1894, was sworn in as a member of the Legislative Council.

In 1896, Kershaw left Singapore and went to Selangor to take up the appointment as the first Legal Adviser to the newly formed Federated Malay States. Whilst in office he carried out pioneer work in reforming the antiquated legal systems operating in the four Protected States where diverse customs and practices were applied. He introduced many enactments, reformed the laws, including a new Civil Code, created new courts, and succeeded in establishing uniformity in administration amongst the states of the newly formed Federation. On several occasions he was appointed Acting Attorney General of the Straits Settlements in the absence of William Collyer including 1901–02 when he went on leave for a year. In 1902, he retired to England.

== Honours ==
In 1903, Kershaw was awarded the Companionship of the Order of St Michael and St George, and in the same year, the Companion of the Order of the Bath.

== Death ==
Kershaw died on 9 December 1913.
