= Arthur's Seat, Kandy =

Lookout spot

Coordinates: 7.2891°N 80.6400°E

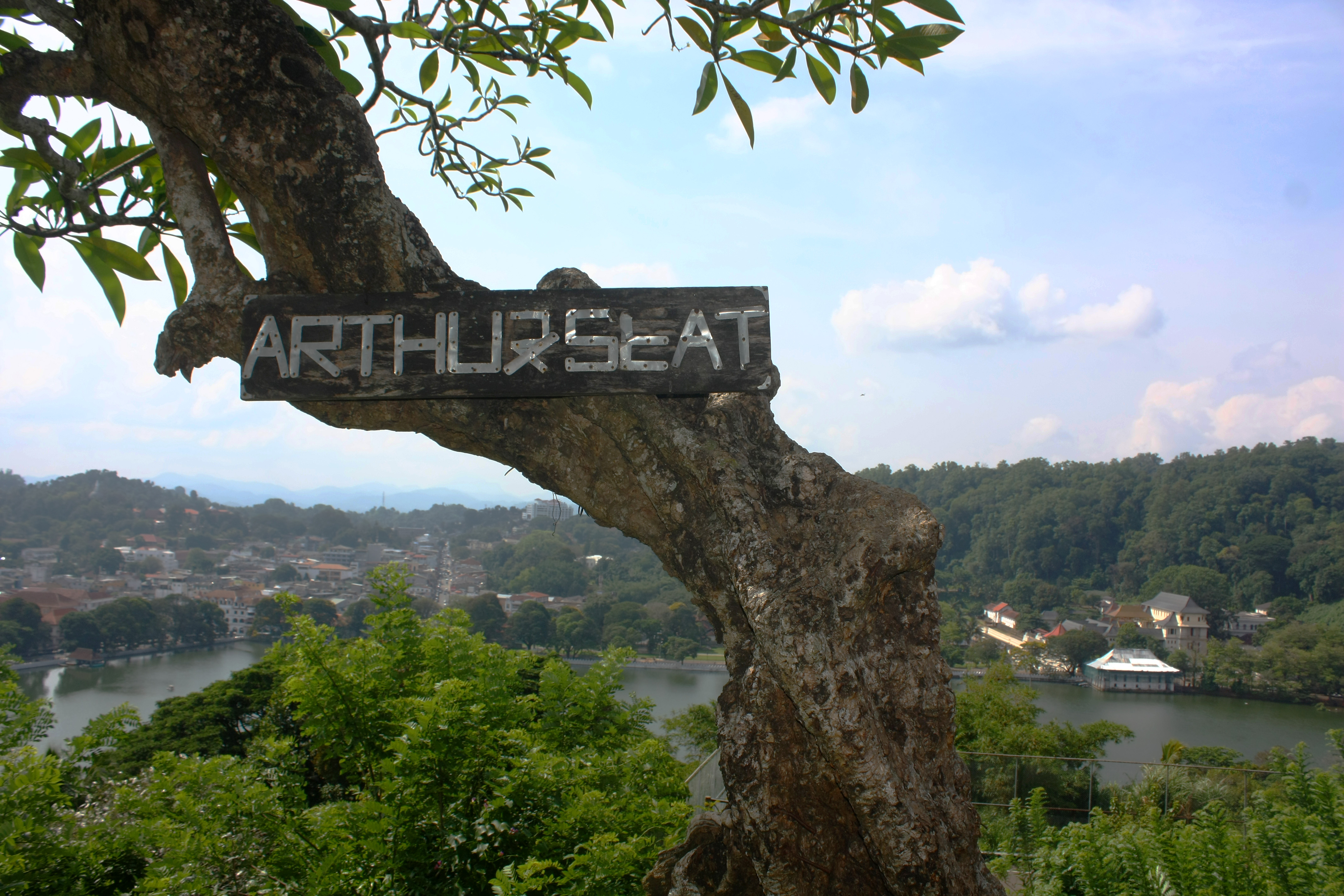
Arthur's Seat

Arthur’s Seat is a popular lookout point southwest of Kandy Lake, just past the Royal Palace Park.

It is located on Rajapihilla Mawatha at 550 m (1,800 ft) above sea level. It provides a panoramic view across Kandy Lake, Sri Dalada Maligawa, the Royal Palace of Kandy and the city centre.

According to local folklore there was a bungalow owned by a Mr. Arthur, a British tea planter, situated above the lookout, who used to view Kandy by standing on a stone seat under a tree in front of his bungalow.

The Kandy Municipal Council estimated in 2015, 1,500 tourists per day visit the location during the peak season (November to May), with 500 tourists per day in the off season.

In early 2016 the Council undertook the construction of the new viewing platform at the location. The City’s Heritage Committee lodged protests against what it considered was an unsightly structure, which had resulted in the original stone seat being destroyed. The new viewing platform is a 35 m (115 ft) by 5 m (16 ft) concrete deck with a symbolical seat made out of the original rock slab. The cost of the construction was Rs 6.474M, funded by the World Bank.
