= Herbert Wace =

British colonial administrator (1851–1906)

Herbert Wace CMG (31 December 1851 – 28 May 1906) was a British colonial administrator who served his career in Ceylon.

== Early life and education ==
Wace was born in 1851, the youngest son of Rev. Richard Henry Wace of Wadhurst, Sussex. He was educated at Westminster School.

== Career ==
Wace entered the Ceylon civil service as a writer in 1873. He then served in a variety of posts including Assistant Collector of Customs (1876); Assistant Government Agent successively in: Kalutara (1879); Ratnapura (1885); Matara (1886), and Nuwara Eliya (1887). In 1889, he served as assistant to the Colonial Secretary, and in the following year was Commissioner of Requests at Colombo.

From 1890, Wace served in the substantive post of Government Agent, successively in: North Western Province (1890); Sabaragamuwa Province (1891); Southern Province (1897), and Central Province from 1900 until his death in 1906.

Wace was sympathetic to the Sinhalese villagers, and took an interest in the Gam Sabhas or village councils; in education; in irrigation, and in the efficiency of the village headmen and police under his charge. In reporting on the Sabaragamuwa district in 1885, he remarked on "the spirit of enterprise so marked in the character of the low country Sinhalese villager so painfully conspicuous by its absence in the Kandyans".

He also served, on occasion as Acting Colonial Secretary, and was a member of both the Executive and Legislative Council of Ceylon.

== Personal life and death ==
Wace married Mabel Blyth. His son Sidney Wace was a British army officer. His brother, Henry Wace, was the Dean of Canterbury.

Wace died of dysentery in Ceylon on 28 May 1906, and was buried in St Paul's Church, Kandy.

== Honours and memorials ==
Wace was appointed Companion of the Order of St Michael and St George (CMG) in the 1903 Birthday Honours.

Wace Park in Kandy, built while he was Mayor of Kandy, is named after him.
