= Esmée Fairbairn Foundation =

British charity

The Esmée Fairbairn Foundation is a registered charity founded in England in 1961. It is one of the larger independent grant-making foundations based in the UK, funding organisations which aim to improve the quality of life for people and communities in that country.

== History ==
The charity was founded in 1961 by Ian Fairbairn, a pioneer of unit trust investments, and was named after his second wife who was killed in World War II. Her sons, Paul and Oliver Stobart, were co-founders. The endowment gave the charity 33% of the shares in the M&G fund management company, and a regular income. This ended when M&G was sold to Prudential Corporation in 1999, but the sale allowed alternative investments that increased the income of the charity.

== Aims ==
The foundation funds projects in the arts, education and learning, the environment and social change. The charity gives £20–40 million annually in grants or investments towards conservation work, community energy projects, national parks and biodiversity work.

The charity initially funded projects to increase understanding and research in economics, as well as social welfare. This included lectures, research fellowships and professorial chairs in the area of economics and mathematics. Examples include the annual Esmée Fairbairn Lecture at the University of Lancaster, an Esmée Fairbairn Junior Research Fellowship in Mathematics at New College, Oxford and the Esmée Fairbairn Chair of Finance at the London Business School from 1966 to 1976. In the 1970s the charity began to fund projects in the arts, environment and heritage as well.

It now focuses on areas where other funders are unlikely to be available. This includes novel and more risky projects. It may provide core funding and loans rather than grants. The foundation also initiates some projects such as "Rethinking Crime & Punishment" in 2002–2005.

In 2020, as a response to structural inequality, climate change and COVID-19, the charity changed its strategy to providing longer-term support to predetermined areas rather than responding to requests. The objective was to ensure it achieved as much as it could with its resources and access, in particular collaborating with other like-minded organisations.

== Administration ==
As income from the charity's endowment and the number of grants grew in the 1990s, the number of trustees was increased and administrative staff were appointed. An investment committee was also required, after the initial endowment was sold. Since 2008 the charity has made some social investments.

Trustees include Sir Jonathan Phillips (chair, from 2019), Tom Chandos, Joe Docherty, John Fairbairn, Beatrice Hollond, Thomas Hughes-Hallett, Kate Lampard, William Sieghart, Eleanor Updale and Edward Bonham-Carter. Past chairs were Jeremy Hardie from 2003 to 2007, Tom Chandos and then James Hughes-Hallett until 2019.

Edgar Palamountain was appointed in 1980 as the charity's first director (part-time) and was succeeded by Sir Robert Andrew in 1989. Margaret Hyde was appointed as director in 1994 and then Dawn Austwick was chief executive officer from 2008 to 2014 and was succeeded by Caroline Mason.
