= Mahanuwara Polling Division =

Mahanuwara
- Polling Division
- Coordinates: 7.268171°N 80.622615°E
- Country: Sri Lanka
- Province: Central Province, Sri Lanka
- Electoral District: Kandy Electoral District

Area
  - Total: 34.16 km^{2} (13.19 sq mi)

Population (2012)
  - Total: 96,017
  - Density: 2,811/km^{2} (7,280/sq mi)
- ISO 3166 code: EC-04I

The Mahanuwara Polling Division is a Polling Division in the Kandy Electoral District, in the Central Province, Sri Lanka.

== Presidential Election Results ==
=== Summary ===
The winner of Mahanuwara has matched the final country result 4 out of 8 times.

Year	Mahanuwara	Kandy Electoral District	MAE %	Sri Lanka	MAE %
2019	NDF	SLPP	6.57%	SLPP	8.58%
2015	NDF	NDF	11.20%	NDF	14.46%
2010	NDF	UPFA	11.68%	UPFA	15.30%
2005	UNP	UNP	9.23%	UPFA	15.08%
1999	UNP	PA	9.50%	PA	10.86%
1994	PA	PA	3.46%	PA	9.06%
1988	UNP	UNP	5.72%	UNP	8.45%
1982	UNP	UNP	8.43%	UNP	12.65%
Matches/Mean MAE	4/8	7/8	8.22%	8/8	11.80%

=== 2019 Sri Lankan Presidential Election ===
Party	Mahanuwara		Kandy Electoral District		Sri Lanka	
Party	Votes	%	Votes	%	Votes	%
NDF	16,334	51.36%	417,355	44.64%	5,564,239	41.99%
SLPP	13,795	43.38%	471,502	50.43%	6,924,255	52.25%
NMPP	966	3.04%	23,539	2.52%	418,553	3.16%
Other Parties (with < 1%)	709	2.23%	22,479	2.40%	345,452	2.61%
Valid Votes	31,804	98.73%	934,875	99.04%	13,252,499	98.99%
Rejected Votes	409	1.27%	9,020	0.96%	135,452	1.01%
Total Polled	32,213	79.52%	943,895	84.89%	13,387,951	83.71%
Registered Electors	40,507		1,111,860		15,992,568	

=== 2015 Sri Lankan Presidential Election ===
Party	Mahanuwara		Kandy Electoral District		Sri Lanka	
Party	Votes	%	Votes	%	Votes	%
NDF	20,316	66.14%	466,994	54.56%	6,217,162	51.28%
UPFA	10,200	33.21%	378,585	44.23%	5,768,090	47.58%
Other Parties (with < 1%)	199	0.65%	10,329	1.21%	138,200	1.14%
Valid Votes	30,715	98.71%	855,908	98.73%	12,123,452	98.85%
Rejected Votes	401	1.29%	10,993	1.27%	140,925	1.15%
Total Polled	31,116	77.75%	866,901	79.71%	12,264,377	78.69%
Registered Electors	40,020		1,087,542		15,585,942	

=== 2010 Sri Lankan Presidential Election ===
Party	Mahanuwara		Kandy Electoral District		Sri Lanka	
Party	Votes	%	Votes	%	Votes	%
NDF	15,358	56.30%	329,492	43.89%	4,173,185	40.15%
UPFA	11,636	42.66%	406,636	54.16%	6,015,934	57.88%
Other Parties (with < 1%)	283	1.04%	14,658	1.95%	204,494	1.97%
Valid Votes	27,277	99.03%	750,786	98.85%	10,393,613	99.03%
Rejected Votes	268	0.97%	8,700	1.15%	101,838	0.97%
Total Polled	27,545	74.57%	759,486	75.87%	10,495,451	66.70%
Registered Electors	36,938		1,001,074		15,734,587	

=== 2005 Sri Lankan Presidential Election ===
Party	Mahanuwara		Kandy Electoral District		Sri Lanka	
Party	Votes	%	Votes	%	Votes	%
UNP	17,130	63.89%	387,150	54.33%	4,706,366	48.43%
UPFA	9,435	35.19%	315,672	44.30%	4,887,152	50.29%
Other Parties (with < 1%)	246	0.92%	9,798	1.37%	123,521	1.27%
Valid Votes	26,811	98.77%	712,620	98.64%	9,717,039	98.88%
Rejected Votes	335	1.23%	9,817	1.36%	109,869	1.12%
Total Polled	27,146	74.73%	722,437	77.37%	9,826,908	69.51%
Registered Electors	36,326		933,754		14,136,979	

=== 1999 Sri Lankan Presidential Election ===
Party	Mahanuwara		Kandy Electoral District		Sri Lanka	
Party	Votes	%	Votes	%	Votes	%
UNP	13,809	54.60%	276,360	45.10%	3,602,748	42.71%
PA	10,101	39.94%	308,187	50.29%	4,312,157	51.12%
JVP	639	2.53%	15,512	2.53%	343,927	4.08%
Other Parties (with < 1%)	394	1.56%	9,472	1.55%	140,825	1.67%
SMBP	349	1.38%	3,280	0.54%	35,854	0.43%
Valid Votes	25,292	97.59%	612,811	97.29%	8,435,754	97.69%
Rejected Votes	624	2.41%	17,060	2.71%	199,536	2.31%
Total Polled	25,916	75.32%	629,871	77.61%	8,635,290	72.17%
Registered Electors	34,410		811,606		11,965,536	

=== 1994 Sri Lankan Presidential Election ===
Party	Mahanuwara		Kandy Electoral District		Sri Lanka	
Party	Votes	%	Votes	%	Votes	%
PA	12,339	52.98%	320,110	56.64%	4,709,205	62.28%
UNP	10,477	44.98%	235,519	41.68%	2,715,283	35.91%
SMBP	258	1.11%	2,618	0.46%	32,651	0.43%
Other Parties (with < 1%)	217	0.93%	6,870	1.22%	104,389	1.38%
Valid Votes	23,291	97.56%	565,117	97.55%	7,561,526	98.03%
Rejected Votes	583	2.44%	14,179	2.45%	151,706	1.97%
Total Polled	23,874	73.83%	579,296	77.85%	7,713,232	69.12%
Registered Electors	32,335		744,151		11,158,880	

=== 1988 Sri Lankan Presidential Election ===
Party	Mahanuwara		Kandy Electoral District		Sri Lanka	
Party	Votes	%	Votes	%	Votes	%
UNP	11,301	59.87%	234,124	54.88%	2,569,199	50.43%
SLFP	6,959	36.86%	186,187	43.65%	2,289,857	44.95%
SLMP	617	3.27%	6,266	1.47%	235,701	4.63%
Valid Votes	18,877	98.45%	426,577	98.57%	5,094,754	98.24%
Rejected Votes	297	1.55%	6,167	1.43%	91,499	1.76%
Total Polled	19,174	66.21%	432,744	68.36%	5,186,256	55.87%
Registered Electors	28,958		633,030		9,283,143	

=== 1982 Sri Lankan Presidential Election ===
Party	Mahanuwara		Kandy Electoral District		Sri Lanka	
Party	Votes	%	Votes	%	Votes	%
UNP	15,729	68.60%	289,621	59.80%	3,450,815	52.93%
SLFP	6,498	28.34%	178,647	36.89%	2,546,348	39.05%
JVP	408	1.78%	12,493	2.58%	273,428	4.19%
Other Parties (with < 1%)	295	1.29%	3,536	0.73%	249,460	3.83%
Valid Votes	22,930	99.12%	484,297	99.07%	6,520,156	98.78%
Rejected Votes	203	0.88%	4,548	0.93%	80,470	1.22%
Total Polled	23,133	77.76%	488,845	89.44%	6,600,626	80.15%
Registered Electors	29,751		546,565		8,235,358	

== Parliamentary Election Results ==
=== Summary ===
The winner of Mahanuwara has matched the final country result 3 out of 7 times.

Year	Mahanuwara	Kandy Electoral District	MAE %	Sri Lanka	MAE %
2015	UNP	UNP	8.65%	UNP	14.07%
2010	UNP	UPFA	15.38%	UPFA	15.78%
2004	UNP	UNP	9.94%	UPFA	15.62%
2001	UNP	UNP	12.24%	UNP	13.80%
2000	UNP	PA	12.27%	PA	11.54%
1994	UNP	UNP	2.61%	PA	7.40%
1989	UNP	UNP	2.36%	UNP	7.92%
Matches/Mean MAE	3/7	5/7	9.06%	7/7	12.31%

=== 2015 Sri Lankan Parliamentary Election ===
Party	Mahanuwara		Kandy Electoral District		Sri Lanka	
Party	Votes	%	Votes	%	Votes	%
UNP	18,346	64.26%	440,761	55.61%	5,098,916	45.77%
UPFA	8,369	29.31%	309,152	39.00%	4,732,664	42.48%
JVP	1,497	5.24%	30,669	3.87%	544,154	4.88%
Other Parties (with < 1%)	339	1.19%	12,055	1.52%	100,088	0.90%
Valid Votes	28,551	97.50%	792,637	95.48%	11,140,333	95.35%
Rejected Votes	721	2.46%	37,065	4.46%	516,926	4.42%
Total Polled	29,282	73.17%	830,165	79.13%	11,684,111	77.66%
Registered Electors	40,020		1,049,160		15,044,490	

=== 2010 Sri Lankan Parliamentary Election ===
Party	Mahanuwara		Kandy Electoral District		Sri Lanka	
Party	Votes	%	Votes	%	Votes	%
UNP	10,226	48.76%	192,798	34.50%	2,357,057	29.37%
UPFA	9,187	43.81%	339,819	60.81%	4,846,388	60.38%
DNA	1,454	6.93%	23,728	4.25%	441,251	5.50%
Other Parties (with < 1%)	105	0.50%	2,459	0.44%	30,354	0.38%
Valid Votes	20,972	93.75%	558,804	90.49%	8,026,322	96.03%
Rejected Votes	1,389	6.21%	58,333	9.45%	581,465	6.96%
Total Polled	22,369	60.56%	617,559	61.70%	8,358,246	59.29%
Registered Electors	36,938		1,000,861		14,097,690	

=== 2004 Sri Lankan Parliamentary Election ===
Party	Mahanuwara		Kandy Electoral District		Sri Lanka	
Party	Votes	%	Votes	%	Votes	%
UNP	14,367	55.99%	313,859	49.99%	3,486,792	37.73%
UPFA	7,141	27.83%	268,131	42.71%	4,223,126	45.70%
JHU	3,959	15.43%	42,192	6.72%	552,723	5.98%
Other Parties (with < 1%)	192	0.75%	3,684	0.59%	64,227	0.69%
Valid Votes	25,659	95.81%	627,866	93.24%	9,241,931	94.52%
Rejected Votes	1,123	4.19%	45,484	6.75%	534,452	5.47%
Total Polled	26,782	72.86%	673,380	76.47%	9,777,821	75.74%
Registered Electors	36,760		880,634		12,909,631	

=== 2001 Sri Lankan Parliamentary Election ===
Party	Mahanuwara		Kandy Electoral District		Sri Lanka	
Party	Votes	%	Votes	%	Votes	%
UNP	16,764	65.64%	314,297	52.77%	4,086,026	45.62%
PA	6,489	25.41%	233,637	39.23%	3,330,815	37.19%
JVP	1,551	6.07%	37,146	6.24%	815,353	9.10%
SU	551	2.16%	4,040	0.68%	50,665	0.57%
Other Parties (with < 1%)	183	0.72%	6,456	1.08%	78,682	0.88%
Valid Votes	25,538	95.68%	595,576	93.40%	8,955,844	94.77%
Rejected Votes	1,152	4.32%	42,103	6.60%	494,009	5.23%
Total Polled	26,690	75.50%	637,679	76.03%	9,449,878	76.03%
Registered Electors	35,351		838,687		12,428,762	

=== 2000 Sri Lankan Parliamentary Election ===
Party	Mahanuwara		Kandy Electoral District		Sri Lanka	
Party	Votes	%	Votes	%	Votes	%
UNP	12,460	49.53%	243,623	40.27%	3,451,765	40.12%
PA	7,254	28.83%	282,282	46.66%	3,899,329	45.33%
NUA	1,803	7.17%	32,023	5.29%	185,593	2.16%
SU	1,722	6.85%	10,999	1.82%	127,859	1.49%
JVP	1,105	4.39%	21,565	3.56%	518,725	6.03%
Other Parties (with < 1%)	412	1.64%	8,328	1.38%	138,824	1.61%
CWC	401	1.59%	6,108	1.01%	22,985	0.27%
Valid Votes	25,157	N/A	604,928	N/A	8,602,617	N/A

=== 1994 Sri Lankan Parliamentary Election ===
Party	Mahanuwara		Kandy Electoral District		Sri Lanka	
Party	Votes	%	Votes	%	Votes	%
UNP	13,342	54.58%	301,824	52.35%	3,498,370	44.04%
PA	10,591	43.33%	267,683	46.43%	3,887,805	48.94%
MEP	355	1.45%	3,495	0.61%	68,538	0.86%
Other Parties (with < 1%)	155	0.63%	3,550	0.62%	107,038	1.35%
Valid Votes	24,443	96.67%	576,552	94.89%	7,943,688	95.20%
Rejected Votes	843	3.33%	31,019	5.11%	400,395	4.80%
Total Polled	25,286	78.20%	607,571	81.67%	8,344,095	74.75%
Registered Electors	32,335		743,939		11,163,064	

=== 1989 Sri Lankan Parliamentary Election ===
Party	Mahanuwara		Kandy Electoral District		Sri Lanka	
Party	Votes	%	Votes	%	Votes	%
UNP	9,513	61.87%	204,973	61.72%	2,838,005	50.71%
SLFP	3,911	25.44%	105,977	31.91%	1,785,369	31.90%
SLMC	1,263	8.21%	14,697	4.43%	202,016	3.61%
USA	556	3.62%	5,147	1.55%	141,983	2.54%
Other Parties (with < 1%)	132	0.86%	1,315	0.40%	67,723	1.21%
Valid Votes	15,375	95.24%	332,109	93.69%	5,596,468	93.87%
Rejected Votes	768	4.76%	22,374	6.31%	365,563	6.13%
Total Polled	16,143	57.11%	354,483	56.42%	5,962,031	63.60%
Registered Electors	28,267		628,317		9,374,164	

== Demographics ==
=== Ethnicity ===
The Mahanuwara Polling Division has a Sinhalese majority (70.6%), a significant Sri Lankan Tamil population (11.3%) and a significant Moor population (11.2%) . In comparison, the Kandy Electoral District (which contains the Mahanuwara Polling Division) has a Sinhalese majority (74.4%) and a significant Moor population (13.9%)

Ethnicity in Mahanuwara
1. Sinhalese (70.6%)
2. Sri Lankan Tamil (11.3%)
3. Moor (11.2%)
4. Indian Tamil (5.00%)
5. Other (1.90%)

=== Religion ===
The Mahanuwara Polling Division has a Buddhist majority (67.2%), a significant Hindu population (13.5%) and a significant Muslim population (12.6%) . In comparison, the Kandy Electoral District (which contains the Mahanuwara Polling Division) has a Buddhist majority (73.4%) and a significant Muslim population (14.3%)

Religion in Mahanuwara
1. Buddhist (67.2%)
2. Hindu (13.5%)
3. Muslim (12.6%)
4. Roman Catholic (4.30%)
5. Other Christian (2.50%)
6. Other (0.00%)
