= Barbara Wace =

British journalist (1907–2003)

- Born: 4 September 1907; Gillingham, Kent, England
- Died: 16 January 2003 (aged 95); London, England
- Occupation: Journalist

Barbara Wace (4 September 1907 – 16 January 2003) was a British journalist. She worked for the Foreign Office in Berlin and Washington, D.C., joining the British Information Service during the 1940s. She became a journalist for the Associated Press (AP), covering the Allied invasion in France as the first British female reporter to report on the invasion following D-Day. After the end of World War II, Wace travelled around the world as a freelancer for a number of publications, including National Geographic, The Manchester Guardian and The New York Times.

== Early life ==
Wace was born on 4 September 1907 in Gillingham, Kent. Her father was Brigadier-General E. Gurth Wace, an Army officer who had served in India with the Royal Engineers, where he met and married Eva Sim. She had one sister, Daphne. Wace attended the Royal High School, Bath, which taught the daughters of army officers, although she spent significant time in France and Germany. Her father was serving as the British representative of the commission tasked with establishing the boundaries of the new territory of the Saar Basin following the Treaty of Versailles.

== Career ==
Wace began working at the Foreign Office as secretary to Viscount Cranborne during the 1930s, before becoming a secretary for Anthony Eden. As he was the Foreign Secretary, he brought her to the League of Nations Assembly in Geneva. She worked in the British Embassy in Berlin, where Eric Phipps was the ambassador, as a secretary from 1935 to 1936. While there, she attended the 1936 Olympic Games, where she saw Jesse Owens win the 100 yards dash. She worked for the public relations department at the Savoy then re-joined the Foreign Office, moving to the Washington, D.C. embassy in 1940. She worked for the nascent British Information Service, which was intended to convince Americans that Britain would win World War II, in D.C., San Francisco and New York. Wanting to get involved in the war effort, Wace travelled by boat back to the United Kingdom in February 1943, where she applied for a job in a factory through the Ministry of Labour. Instead she was offered a position with the Associated Press (AP).

=== War correspondent ===
Wace was appointed by the AP to a group of 18 journalists and photographers who covered the Allied invasion in France. Since she was working for an American news agency, she was able to be accredited to report on the American forces, whereas British women did not receive accreditation until after the liberation of Paris in August 1944. She was the first British woman to report on the Allied invasion of Normandy following D-Day, as she was accompanied by the American journalist Ruth Cowan. Her first story was on the female soldiers for the Women's Army Corps who arrived at Omaha Beach on 14 July 1944. She filed five stories, including a report that the women had received wolf whistles while riding in a lorry. As Wace spoke French, she then travelled through the country to interview local people about their experiences.

She visited northern France twice more before August, when she was asked to support the new AP office in Paris. She covered the Battle for Brest, although she was replaced by a male reporter at the end of the siege and his byline appeared on the story. In contrast, Wace was known for sending a telegram that read "Brest fallen lost skirt" after her belongings were stolen. She was sent to Oslo to report on the return of the Norwegian government and the return from exile of King Haakon VII in June 1945.

=== Post-war career ===
Following the end of the war, Wace continued to work for AP for a time, before becoming one of the rare female freelancers on Fleet Street in London. Her freelance career began with a trip through the United States by Greyhound bus to write a story for Reader's Digest. She ultimately travelled to at least 60 countries, including Albania in 1956, Madagascar and Mongolia in 1991. She reported from Andaman Islands, Baffin Island and the Pescadores. Wace interviewed the Sultan of Muscat, Said bin Taimur. At a time when Oman issued few visas, she travelled to the country three times to meet with the Sultan, beginning in 1959. She wrote for National Geographic, The Manchester Guardian and The New York Times, and broadcast for the BBC World Service. She covered the 1953 coronation of Queen Elizabeth II for The New York Times.

== Personal life ==
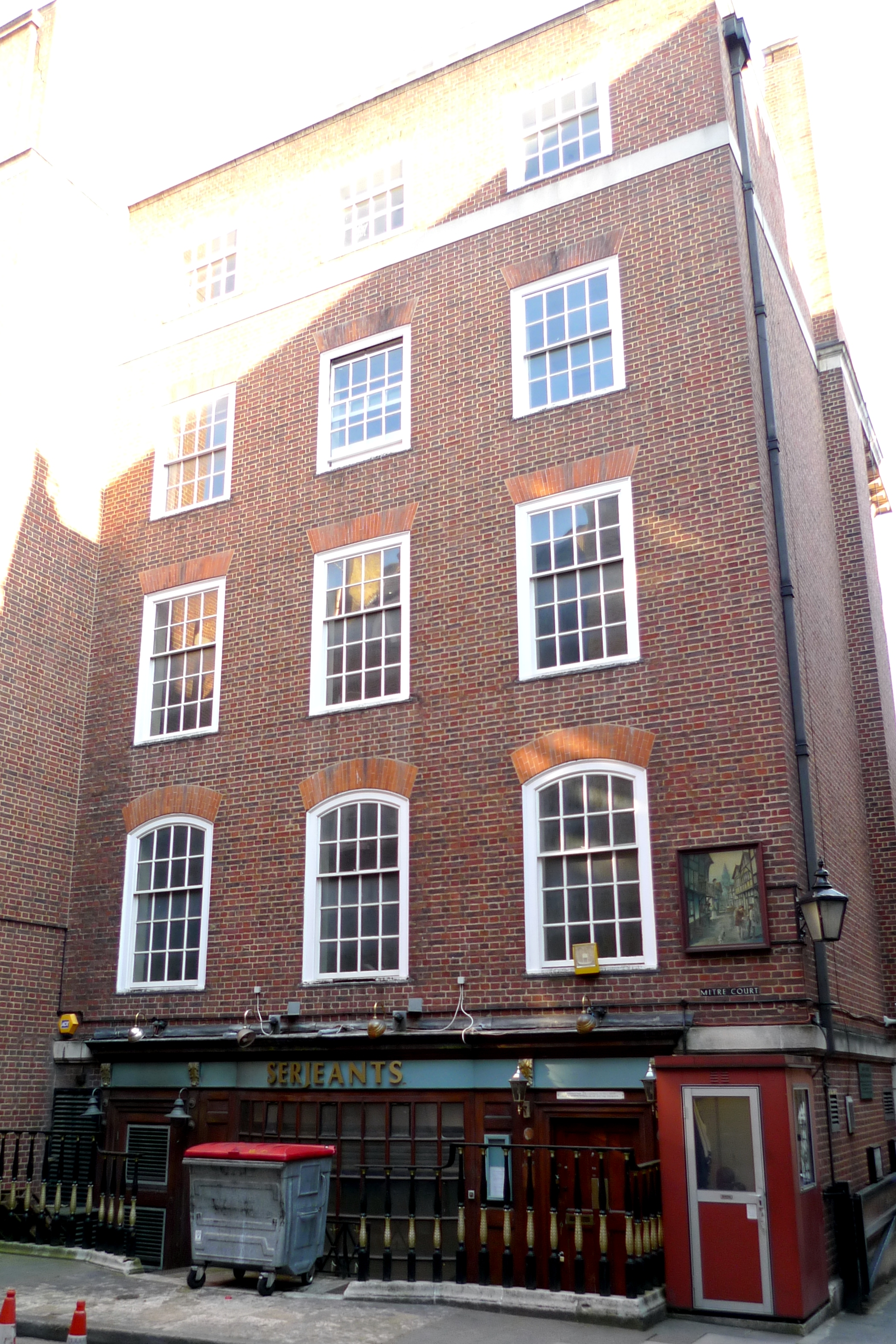
Wace lived above the Clachan pub (renamed Serjeants), pictured in 2009

Wace lived above the Clachan pub at Mitre Court and then spent about twenty years at 53 Fleet Street before moving to public housing at Golden Lane in 1988, when she was the last journalist still living on Fleet Street. She relocated to an old people's home in Blackheath in 1997. She was awarded a Freedom of the City in 1973. In 1990, she sponsored research into Master Wace, a medieval journalist who wrote about the Norman invasion, who she believed may have been her ancestor.

== Death and legacy ==
Wace died in London on 16 January 2003 at the age of 95. The Royal Geographical Society holds a number of her photographs.
