= Sidney Wace =

English cricketer and soldier

Personal information
- Full name: Sidney Laurie Wace
- Born: 1 March 1882; Kalutara, Western Province, British Ceylon
- Died: 13 April 1966 (aged 84); Midhurst, Sussex, England
- Batting: Unknown
- Bowling: Unknown

Domestic team information
- Years: Team
- 1926/27: Europeans

Career statistics
Competition	First-class
Matches	1
Runs scored	21
Batting average	21.00
100s/50s	–/–
Top score	21
Balls bowled	18
Wickets	1
Bowling average	25.00
5 wickets in innings	–
10 wickets in match	–
Best bowling	1/25
Catches/stumpings	–/–
- Source: Cricinfo, 1 December 2023

Sidney Laurie Wace (1 March 1882 – 13 April 1966) was an English first-class cricketer and an officer in both the British Army and the British Indian Army.

The son of Herbert Wace, he was born in British Ceylon at Kalutara in March 1882. He was educated in England at Bradfield College, where he played for the cricket eleven. From there, he went up to the Royal Military Academy at Woolwich, graduating as a second lieutenant into the Royal Engineers in August 1900, with promotion to lieutenant following in July 1903. He transferred to the British Indian Army in October 1903, joining the 26th Light Cavalry. A further promotion to captain followed in August 1909, with Wace serving in the First World War, during which he was made a temporary major in August 1916. He gained the full rank of major in September 1917, whilst after the war he was made a brevet lieutenant colonel in February 1919, while commanding the East Anglian Division train; he relinquished this rank in August 1919, when his command ceased.

Wace transferred to the 3rd (Lahore) Division in August 1919, where he commanded the divisional train and was permitted to retain the rank of brevet lieutenant colonel; he gained the rank of lieutenant colonel in full in August 1926. In November of the same year, he made a single appearance in first-class cricket for the Europeans cricket team against the touring Marylebone Cricket Club (MCC) at Rawalpindi. Opening the batting in the Europeans first innings, he was dismissed for 21 runs by Arthur Gilligan, while in their second innings he was batting at number four, but was not required to bat. With the ball, he took the wicket of Maurice Tate in the MCC first innings. In the British Indian Army, he was promoted to colonel in October 1930. He was mentioned in dispatches whilst a quartermaster general in Waziristan during the Afridi Redshirt Rebellion of 1930–1931. He retired from active service in October 1934. Wace resided in Liphook in Hampshire during his retirement, and died across the county border in Midhurst in April 1966.
