= Laura Toogood =

Laura Toogood (born 9 December 1984) is an author and commentator on digital issues.

== Career ==
Toogood graduated from the Royal High School, Bath. In 2010, she completed her PhD in the area of Social Informatics at University College Dublin. She was an Ad Astra scholar.

She is the author of the book Journalism and PR: News Media and Public Relations in the Digital Age with John Lloyd, which was published by I.B. Tauris.

Toogood is a regular media contributor and has written about various topics relating to technology for The Sunday Times and the Telegraph. She is also an expert for various broadcasters including the BBC. She appears on ITV's This Morning as an Internet Safety Expert. She was filmed in conversation with John Cruickshank, Publisher of Canada's largest newspaper the Toronto Star, when giving an address to the Empire Club of Canada to discuss the future of journalism and public relations in the new media age.

Toogood is the founder and editor of British luxury lifestyle publication The Sloaney.

== Equestrian ==
Toogood was a dedicated equestrian and represented Great Britain at several international competitions throughout her sporting career. In 2000, she represented the Avon Vale Pony club at the Pony Club National Championships. Toogood is also a former member of the British Junior Three Day Eventing team and competed at the 2002 Junior European Championships on The Fieldmaster, her bay gelding, finishing second best of the British. She was shortlisted for the British U21 team for the Young Rider European Championships in Portugal and represented Ireland in a Senior Home International 2008 competition riding Ruxton Silberstern.

== Modelling ==
Represented by International Model Management in London and Assets Model Agency in Dublin, Toogood has previously worked for Armani. Toogood gave top riders some tips about how to model when doing a charity fashion for Spinal Research.

== Awards ==
In 2015, she received a 'Women of the Future Award' for Digital and Technology and the Spear's Magazine Future Leader in Wealth Management Award.

Toogood was also included in Management Today's 35 Under 35 list of top businesswomen.

In 2018, she has been ranked in the Spear's 500 Reputation Managers Index.
