= Wales Park =

Park in Kandy, Sri Lanka

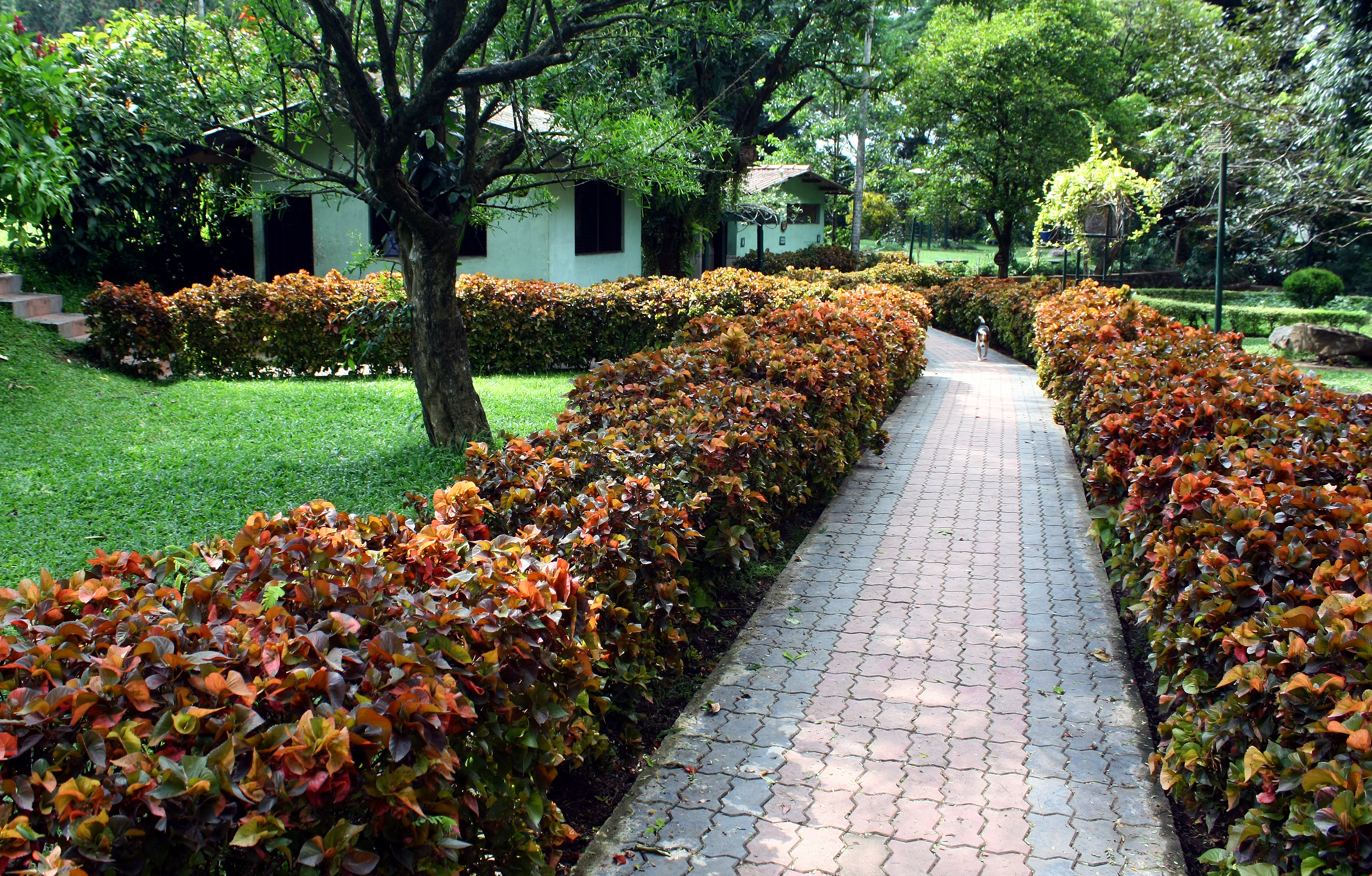
- Entering path at Wales Park
- Interactive map of Wales Park
- Type: Garden
- Location: Kandy, Sri Lanka
- Coordinates: 7°17′24.9″N 80°38′14.5″E
- Area: 2.0 hectares (4.9 acres)
- Created: 1880
- Status: Open all year

The Royal Palace Park, also known as Wales Park, Wace Park or Rajawasala Park, is a small park on top a small hill in the heart of the city of Kandy, that overlooks the Kandy Lake and most of the city. Established by King Sri Vikrama Rajasinha of Sri Lanka it was renamed as Wales Park in honor of the Prince of Wales by the British.

The hill, where the park is currently situated, was known as Castle Hill by the British, as it was the site of the palace of Konappu Bandara, who ruled as Vimaladharmasuriya I of Kandy from 1590 to 1604.

Herbert Wace, CMG (1851–1906), the Government Agent of the Central Province and acting Colonial Secretary, arranged for this neglected site to be restored, and a park be built there in 1880.

In the park is a Japanese Type 4 15 cm howitzer which was captured by the British 14th Army in Burma during World War II and presented to the City of Kandy by Lord Mountbatten, Supreme Allied Commander – South East Asia Theatre.
