= Ashbury =

Ashbury may refer to:

== Places ==
- Ashbury, Bangor, a suburb of Bangor, Northern Ireland
- Ashbury, Bloemfontein, South Africa
- Ashbury Camp, Cornwall, England, an Iron Age hillfort
- Ashbury, Devon, England
  - Ashbury railway station, a closed railway station
- Ashbury, New South Wales, a suburb of Sydney, Australia
- Ashbury, Oxfordshire, England
- Ashbury, Western Cape, South Africa
- Haight-Ashbury, a district of San Francisco, California, United States, notable for being the center of 60s drug culture

== People ==
- James Lloyd Ashbury (1834–1895), British yachtsman and politician
- Joseph Ashbury (1638–1720), English actor and theatrical manager

== Other ==
- Ashbury College, a school in Ottawa, Canada
- Ashbury Heights, a Swedish synthpop music band
- Ashbury Railway Carriage and Iron Company Ltd, a manufacturer of railway equipment
- Ashbury, a hard rock band from Tucson, Arizona, U.S.

== See also ==
- Ashburys railway station, Manchester, England, named after the railway carriage company
