= Holsworthy railway station =

Former railway station in Devon, England

Coordinates: 50°48′28″N 4°21′13″W

Holsworthy
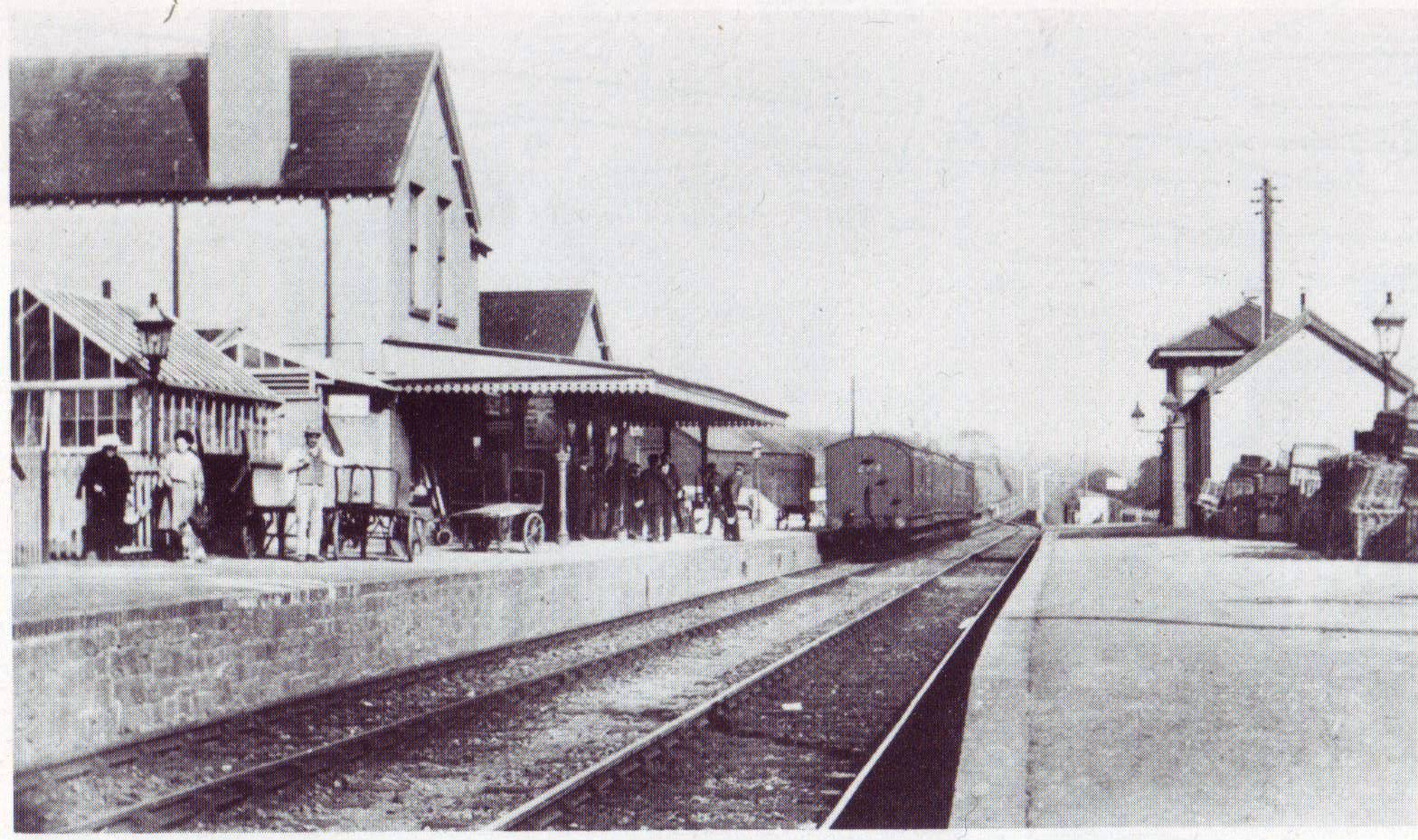
- Holsworthy Station in 1905

General information
- Location: Holsworthy, Torridge; England
- Grid reference: SS342036
- Platforms: 2

Other information
- Status: Disused

History
- Original company: London and South Western Railway
- Pre-grouping: London and South Western Railway
- Post-grouping: Southern Railway; British Rail

Key dates
- 20 January 1879: Opened
- 11 August 1898: Resited when line extended to Bude
- 3 October 1966: Closed
Location

Holsworthy was a railway station in Devon, England, on the now-closed railway line from Okehampton to Bude. It opened in 1879 to serve the market town Holsworthy and closed in 1966, a victim of the Beeching Axe.

== History ==
Parliamentary authority to construct a line from Okehampton to Bude had first been obtained as far back as 1865 with the passing of the Bude Canal and Launceston Junction Railway Act (c.cclxiii). However, this scheme was never put into action and the construction powers lapsed. In 1873 new powers were obtained by the Devon and Cornwall Railway in the shape of the Devon and Cornwall Railway (Western Extensions) Act (c.cxii) which authorised a line from Meldon Junction to Holsworthy where a terminus was to be constructed; Bude was not, at the time, considered important enough to warrant its own station. In 1874 the Devon and Cornwall Railway was purchased by the London and South Western Railway (LSWR), commencing construction on the line the following year.

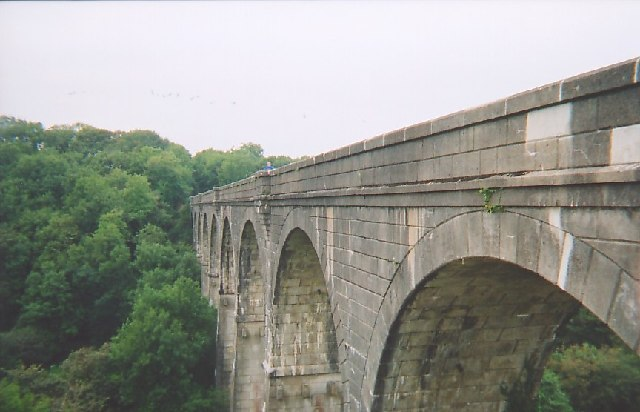
Derriton Viaduct

The station was opened along with the single-track line on 20 January 1879 and the LSWR began operating a smart horse-drawn omnibus service to Bude in connection with the trains. The station was approached across Holsworthy Viaduct, a structure consisting of nine 50 ft spans and the first of its kind to be built entirely out of concrete.

By 1898 Bude had developed sufficiently for the LSWR, under pressure from local residents, to extend the line westwards to the coastal port. The new section opened on 11 August 1898 and necessitated the rebuilding of Holsworthy Station; little is known about the first station as no plans or photographs appear to exist of it. The new station was rather unusual in that it was situated between two viaducts—Holsworthy Viaduct to the east and Derriton Viaduct to the west. A new 20-lever signalbox was installed and the turntable and engine shed from the earlier station were kept. The turntable lasted until 1 January 1911 when it was demolished, and the goods shed until the 1920s. The goods yard was unusually large and complicated for a local station such as Holsworthy and incorporated a run-around line to enable short trains to bypass the station without fouling the main line.

The station was served for many years by the Atlantic Coast Express from London Waterloo, but this was withdrawn following the transfer of the line to the Western Region of British Railways in January 1963. The station and line were proposed for closure by Richard Beeching, Chairman of the British Railways Board, in his report published in March of that year. For the last few years of its life, the service to Holsworthy was operated entirely by Diesel Multiple Units working as "locals" between Okehampton and Bude.

=== Stationmasters ===
- Thomas Lock 1878 - 1894 (formerly station master at South Molton Road)
- Thomas Furze 1894 - 1898 (afterwards station master at Bude)
- Alfred Hearson Webb 1898 - 1914 (formerly station master at Bow)
- J.A. Balch 1914 - 1920 (formerly station master at Halwill Junction, afterwards station master at Ilfracombe)
- F. Fishleigh 1920 - 1925
- Harry George Parbery 1925 - 1936
- A.E. Heard 1935 - 1942 (formerly station master at Otterham, afterwards station master at Sherborne)
- G. Copp 1942 – 1947 (formerly station master at Milborne Port, afterwards station master at Exmouth)

== Services ==
Preceding station	Disused railways	Following station
Dunsland Cross	British Rail; Western Region; Bude Branch	Whitstone & Bridgerule

== The station today ==
Holsworthy has experienced steady growth since the closure of its station in the 1960s. The population increased by 15% from 1981 to 1999 and was estimated at 2,116. The town (no longer a village) has also seen significant economic growth with the development of the Dobles Lane Industrial Estate to its north and the conversion of 4.6 hectares of land to industrial use between 1989 and 2000. However, the town suffers from a lack of public transport; as Torridge District Council recently stated, "Holsworthy is not well served by public transport", notably with regard to connections to Bideford, Barnstaple and Great Torrington; these towns are, at present, linked by buses which are "limited in respect of frequency of service". Connections to Exeter and Plymouth are even more limited, "often only weekly if available at all".

One means of alleviating the lack of facilities has been to provide for a cycleroute, the "Ruby Way" - part of the National Cycle Network, along the trackbed of the former railway which opened in 2005, linking Holsworthy with Bude and Halwill. The cycleway brought one of the viaducts (Derriton) back into public use. Both are now in the ownership of Sustrans. Torridge District Council has indicated that the viaducts, as well as the trackbed, are safeguarded against future development in accordance with planning policies. Access to Derriton Viaduct is provided by the "Cornish Corkscrew", an elaborate spiralling ramp. In the meantime, Devon County Council have continued to support the development and extension of the cycleway project by purchasing further sections of trackbed and seeking to connect the Bude to Holsworthy route to other cyclepaths such as the Cornish Way at Helebridge.

The station buildings were swept away following the line's closure and the site, lying between Underlane, Bodmin Street and Station Road, was until recently derelict. It then became brownfield land and is now the site of a Supermarket and part of a housing development. Nevertheless, the route of the cyclepath, which runs along the southern part of the site, will be protected and the council has suggested that facilities be provided to serve the route's users, a possible suitable location being the site of the former turntable which is to the east of Chapel Street.
