= Hatherleigh railway station =

Former railway station in Devon, England

Hatherleigh
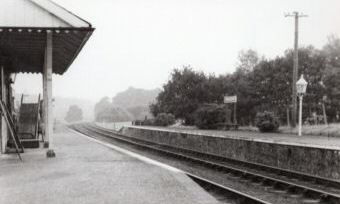
- Note the two platforms

General information
- Location: Hatherleigh, West Devon; England
- Coordinates: 50.8299750°N 4.0843000°W
- Grid reference: SS533054
- Platforms: Two

Other information
- Status: Disused

History
- Post-grouping: North Devon and Cornwall Junction Light Railway (1925 to 1948); Southern Region of British Railways (1948 to 1965)

Key dates
- 27 July 1925: Opened
- 1 March 1965: Closed
Location

Hatherleigh Railway Station was a station on the North Devon and Cornwall Junction Light Railway between Torrington and Halwill Junction, serving the town of Hatherleigh. Hatherleigh was the largest place with a station on the line, though the town was almost two miles away. Like others on this line, the station itself was small but it was a passing place on the mainly single-track railway. The stationmaster at Hatherleigh also looked after the other stations on the line, even those, such as Petrockstow and Hole, that were staffed.

The line was opened in 1925 and was operated by the Southern Railway, though it remained a private line until it became part of the Southern Region of British Railways in 1948. The line closed in 1965 as part of the Beeching proposals, goods services having been withdrawn the previous year.

Preceding station	Disused railways	Following station
Meeth	North Devon and Cornwall Junction Light Railway (1925 to 1948); Southern Region of British Railways (1948 to 1965)	Hole

== See also ==
- List of closed railway stations in Britain
