= North Devon and Cornwall Junction Light Railway =

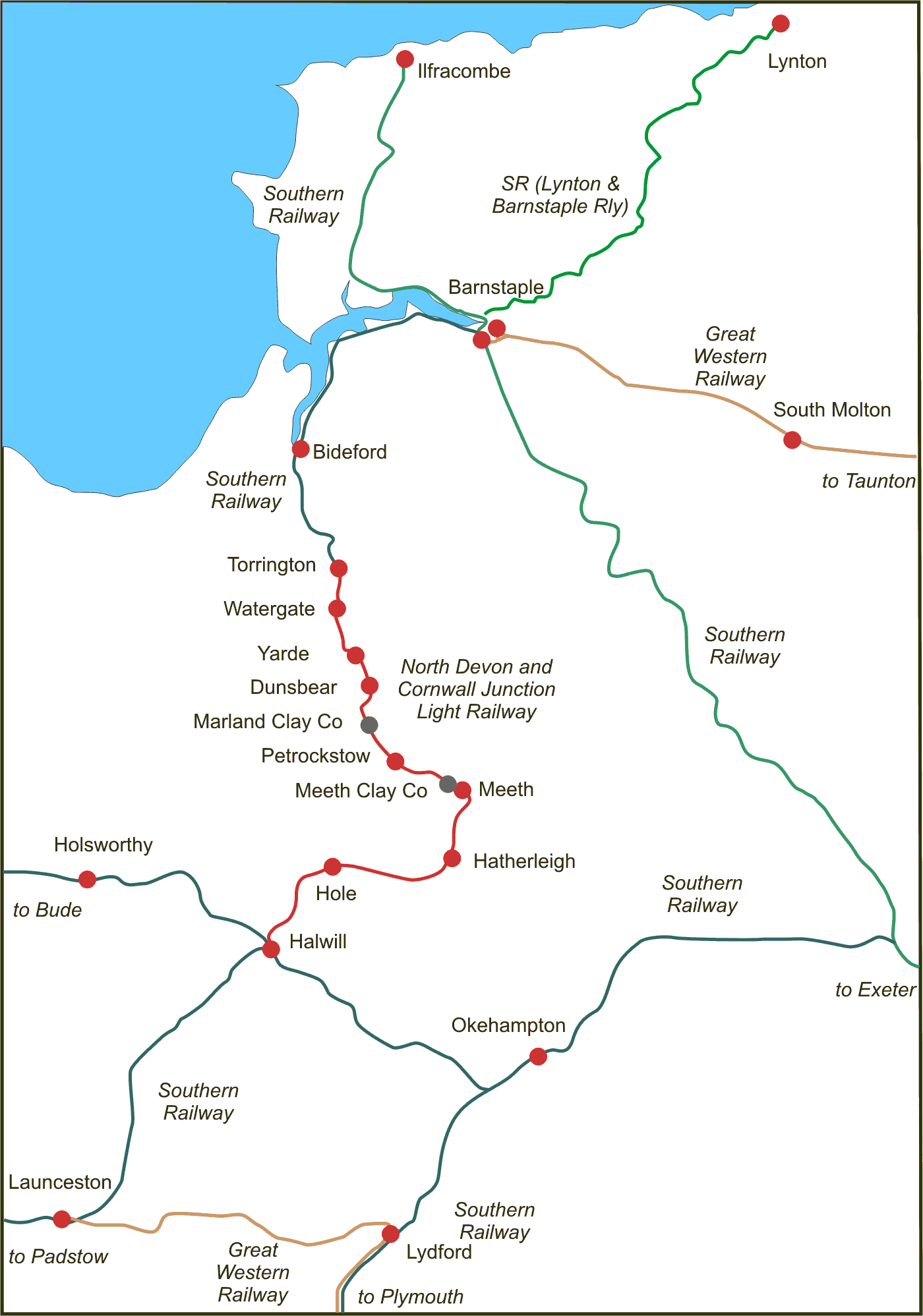
Map of the line

The North Devon and Cornwall Junction Light Railway was a railway built to serve numerous ball clay pits that lay in the space between the London and South Western Railway's Torrington branch, an extension of the North Devon Railway group, and Halwill, an important rural junction on the North Cornwall Railway and its Okehampton to Bude Line.

Ball clay was an important mineral but its weight and bulk required efficient transportation; the material had been brought to main line railways by a 3 ft (914 mm) gauge tramway. Expanding volumes prompted conversion to a light railway—requiring less complex engineering and operational procedures than a full railway—and it was opened on 27 July 1925.

Passengers were carried in addition to the mineral traffic, but the business largely consisted of workers at the ball clay pits themselves. (Thomas says, "The largest place on the railway is Hatherleigh ... a market town in the centre of a barren countryside, it is badly decayed".)

The conversion from a tramway was overseen by Colonel Stephens, the famous owner and operator of marginal English and Welsh railways. Although in construction details typically Stephens this was visually a Southern Railway branch line. It survived in independent status until nationalisation of the railways in 1948, and continued in operation until 1 March 1965. The Exmoor Ranger railtour was exceptionally worked through the entire line on 27 March 1965. The northern part from Meeth and Marland, which was reconstructed from the narrow gauge railway, continued to carry ball clay, but not passengers, until August 1982 (Thomas calls the siding "Marsland" on page 77 but this is an error).

== Route ==
Built as cheaply as possible, and partly following the alignment of the former tramway, the railway had continuous sharp curves and ruling gradients in the range of 1 in 45 to 1 in 50 (2.22 % to 2%)

The stations on the line were:

- Torrington (L&SWR station)
- Watergate Halt (opened 1926)
- Yarde Halt (opened 1926)
- Dunsbear Halt
- (Marland Clay Co Siding)
- Petrockstow
- (Meeth Clay Co Siding)
- Meeth Halt
- Hatherleigh
- Hole (for Black Torrington)
- Halwill Junction

The line was single throughout, worked by Electric Train Tablet (using Tyer's No 6 instruments), and with a maximum speed of 20 mph (32 km/h) from Torrington to Dunsbear Halt, and 25 mph (40 km/h) from there to Halwill.

The 1964/65 working timetable shows two throughout trains each way daily, taking about 80 minutes by diesel multiple unit for the 20-mile (32 km) journey. There were three freight trains Mondays to Fridays serving the clay sidings from the Torrington end. There were no trains on Sundays.

== See also ==
- Southern Railway routes west of Salisbury
