= Bridgerule =

Village in Devon, England

Coordinates: 50.79°N 04.45°W

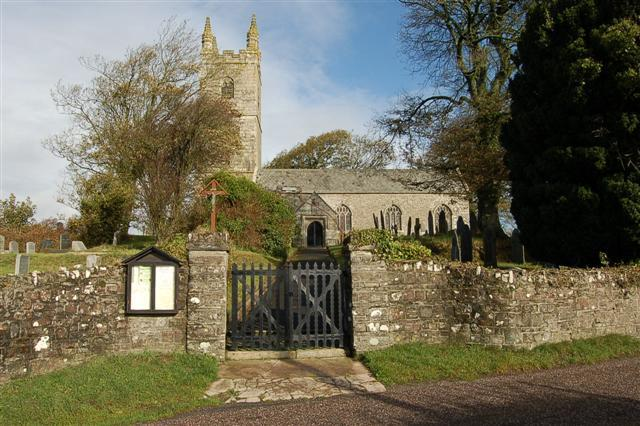
- St Bridget's Church

- Location within Devon
- Population: 570
- OS grid reference: SS2702
- District: Torridge
- Shire county: Devon
- Region: South West
- Country: England
- Sovereign state: United Kingdom
- Post town: Holsworthy
- Postcode district: EX22
- Police: Devon and Cornwall
- Fire: Devon and Somerset
- Ambulance: South Western

Bridgerule is a village and civil parish in Devon, England, a mile from the border with Cornwall. The parish is divided by the River Tamar, which no longer forms the border between Devon and Cornwall there. The river often floods the High Street. An electoral ward exists in the area titled Tamarside. The population at the 2011 census was 1,734

== Etymology ==
Bridgerule was mentioned (as Brige) in the Domesday Book in 1086, when the local manor was held by a Norman, Ruald Adobed. In the 12th century it was called Pons-ruwold-on Tamera in various charters, in 1388 it is named Brugge rewell. The name is thought to come from bridge and Ruald. In Cornish the village is known as Cornish: Ponsrowald meaning "Rowald's Bridge".

== History ==
Until 1844 the Tamar formed the border between Devon and Cornwall, and the western part of the parish was in Cornwall. West Bridgerule was transferred to Devon by the Counties (Detached Parts) Act 1844. When civil parishes were created in 1866, East Bridgerule and West Bridgerule became separate parishes, but the two were re-united in 1950.

Whitstone and Bridgerule railway station on the line from Okehampton to Bude served the village, opening in 1898 and closing in 1966.

== Church ==
There is a 15th-century church dedicated, as at Bridestowe, to Saint Bridget, who is commemorated with a statue. There are also several paintings and carvings within. The baptismal font is very old, dating from Saxon times. The vicar's daughter, Emmeline Maria Kingdon, who was born here in 1817 went on to be a notable head teacher.
