= Halwill Junction railway station =

Former railway station in Devon, England

Coordinates: 50°46′45″N 4°12′30″W

Halwill Junction
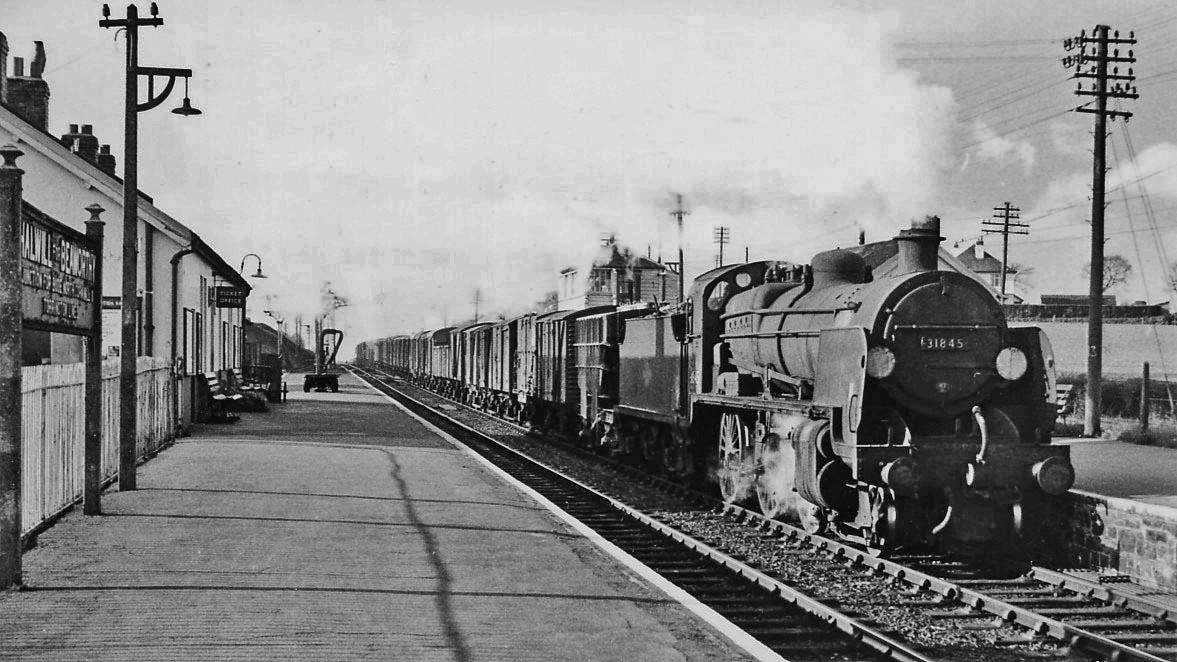
- View northward, towards Wadebridge and Padstow in 1964

General information
- Location: Halwill Junction, Torridge; England
- Grid reference: SS443000
- Platforms: 4 (2 through and 2 bay)

Other information
- Status: Disused

History
- Pre-grouping: LSWR (1879-1923) and NCR (1886-1923)
- Post-grouping: SR (1923-48) and NDCJR (1925 to 1948); BR (1948 to 1966)

Key dates
- 20 January 1879: Opened (Beaworthy)
- July 1879: Renamed (Halwill and Beaworthy)
- 21 July 1886: Becomes a junction station
- March 1887: Renamed (Halwill Junction)
- 1 January 1923: Renamed (Halwill)
- 3 October 1966: Closed
Location

Halwill Junction Railway Station was a railway station in Halwill Junction, near the villages of Halwill and Beaworthy in Devon, England. It opened in 1879 and formed an important junction between the now-closed Bude Branch and North Cornwall line. It closed in 1966 along with the lines which it served, a casualty of the Beeching Report.

== History ==
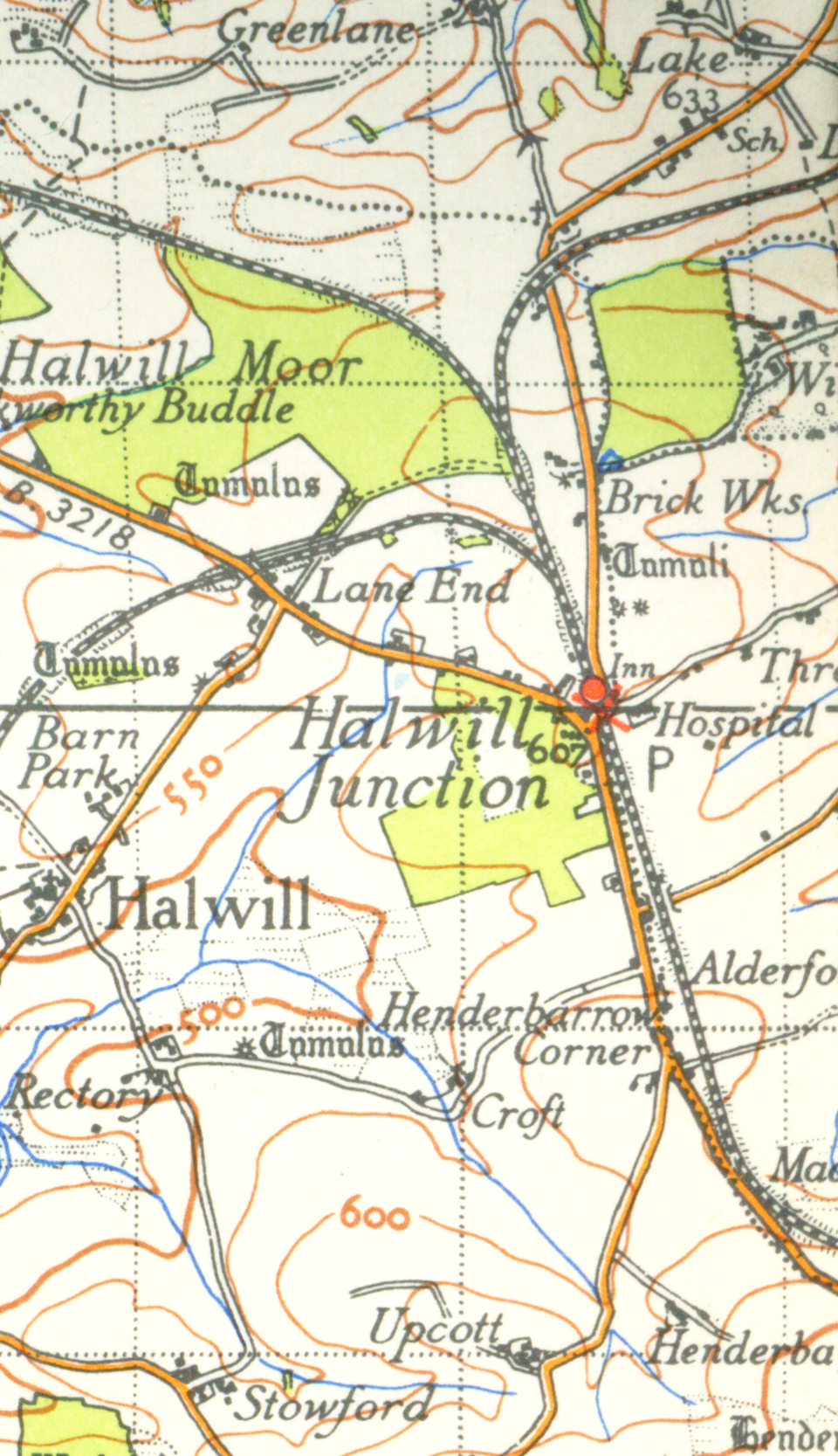
A map of the station and surrounding lines from 1946

The station was opened in January 1879 by the London and South Western Railway (LSWR) following the extension of its line from Meldon Junction on the Okehampton to Plymouth line to Holsworthy on the new Bude Branch. Five years later, it became a junction station with the construction by the North Cornwall Railway of a line south to Launceston which gave the latter company a direct through route over LSWR metals to London Waterloo. The opening of the route south led to the renaming of the station - to Halwill Junction - in March 1887. By the close of the century both lines had been extended - the Bude Branch reaching Bude by 10 August 1898 and the North Cornwall Line to Padstow by 23 March 1899.

A third route stretching out to the north towards Torrington was opened on 27 July 1925 by the North Devon and Cornwall Junction Light Railway. This was served by a separate uncovered platform outside the main station building, situated to the north. The station now became officially known as Halwill, although its running-in board provided a fuller description of the routes available, proudly announcing Halwill for Beaworthy, junction for the Bude, North Cornwall & Torrington Lines.

Always a slightly odd station in the sense that it served no particular large urban conurbation and acted largely as a useful interchange between three different lines, Halwill was at its busiest in the period up to the Second World War when eight sidings were laid to deal with the military traffic in the lead-up to D-Day. It also relied, as did the lines which it served, to a large extent on summer holiday traffic and when this began to dry-up in the late 1950s and early 1960s with the increased use of the motorcar, it became unprofitable and a candidate for closure in the Beeching Report. First proposed for closure in April 1964, Halwill saw its connecting lines close one by one over the next few years - the line north to Torrington closed to passengers on 1 March 1965 and those to Bude and Padstow on 3 October 1966, heralding the end for the formerly important railway junction.

=== Stationmasters ===
- W.H. Newcombe 1878 - 1887
- Alfred Capel 1887 - 1892 (formerly station master at Ashwater, afterwards station master at Yeoford)
- Frank Russell 1892 - 1898 (afterwards station master at Okehampton)
- Wallace Scettrino 1898 - 1904 (formerly station master at Lydford, afterwards station master at Yeoford)
- Percy Lodder 1904 - 1911 (afterwards station master at Teddington)
- J.A. Balch 1911 - 1914 (formerly station master at Whimple, afterwards station master at Holsworthy)
- Alfred Edwin Lock 1914 - 1917 (formerly station master at Colyton, afterwards station master at Bere Ferrers)
- A.J. Brown 1917 - 1920
- N.W. Tancock 1920 - 1924 (afterwards station master at Addlestone)
- F. Bone 1924 - 1932 (afterwards station master at Sidmouth Junction)
- John Ellicott Murch 1932 - 1940 (formerly station master at Lynton)
- Mr. Oliver ca. 1943

== The station today ==
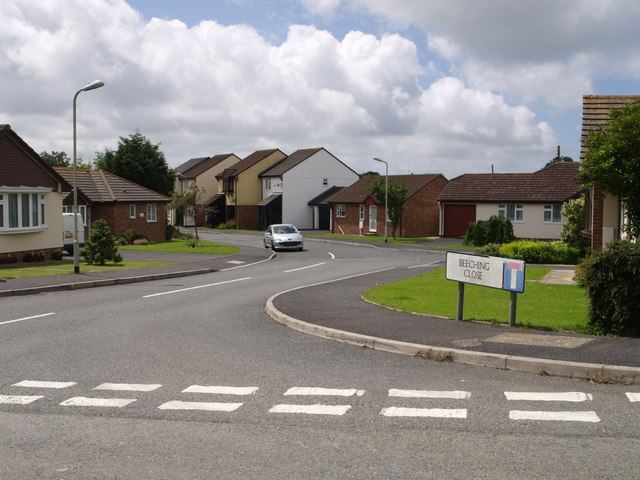
"Beeching Close" near to the site of Halwill Station

The area around the former Halwill station site has undergone residential development and is named "Halwill Junction" after the former station. A housing estate stands near the site of the station, on a road somewhat ironically named "Beeching Close" after the British Railways Board Chairman, Richard Beeching, who recommended the station's closure.

The Junction Inn remains, close to where the level crossing used to be. A gradient marker stands outside, and there are several photographs within of the former station.

In 1990 the Devon Wildlife Trust purchased from British Rail and a private landowner a section of trackbed around Halwill to create a nature reserve covering an area of 2¾ hectares divided into five compartments. In 1998 Devon County Council began works to enable a cycleway to cross the site; this was realised in April 2005 when a 2 1/2 miles (4.0 kilometres) cycleway, forming part of the National Cycle Network, was opened which runs from the village centre via Beeching Close through the nature reserve and the woods on an elevated boardbank to the Forest Centre at Cookworthy where the South West Forest and the Ruby Country Initiative are based. The section was opened as part of a plan by the County Council to extend the Tarka Trail to Hatherleigh, from where the Ruby Way will continue to Halwill Junction and then on to Holsworthy and Bude.

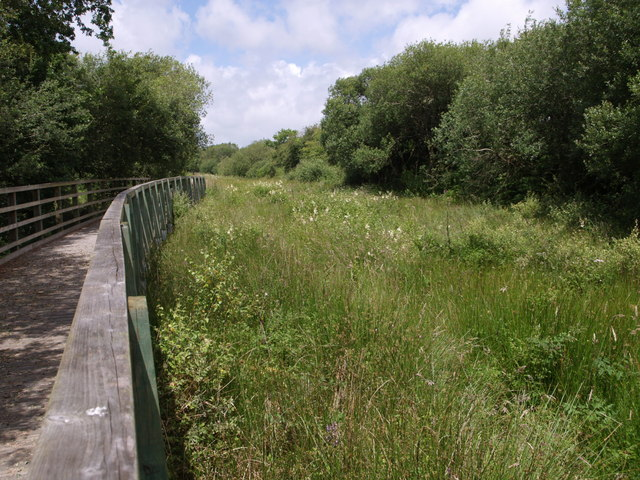
Halwill Junction nature reserve

There are plans to further increase the cycle network by reopening the section east towards Meldon Junction. In 2005 Devon County Council agreed in principle to the creation of a bridleway on an intact disused section of the Bude Branch from Thorndon Cross (near the former Meldon Junction) and Halwill, a distance of approximately 7 miles (11 kilometres). The proposal has made slow progress in the face of objections from local residents and the prohibitive prices demanded for the sale of their land by trackbed owners. In 2007 the Council again reiterated its intention to convert the disused railway to public amenity, reaffirming its intention to create cycleways on the sections from Bude to Halwill and Torrington to Halwill.

== See also ==
- List of closed railway stations in Britain

Preceding station	Disused railways	Following station
Ashbury	L&SWR Bude Branch (1879-1923); Southern (1923-48); Southern Region of British Railways (1948 to 1966)	Dunsland Cross
Terminus	North Devon and Cornwall Junction Light Railway (1925 to 1948); Southern Region of British Railways (1948 to 1966)	Hole
Terminus	North Cornwall Railway to Launceston (1886 to 1923); Southern(1923-1948); Southern Region of British Railways (1948 to 1966)	Ashwater
