= Dunsland Cross railway station =

Former railway station in Devon, England

Coordinates: 50.8025°N 4.2642°W

Dunsland Cross
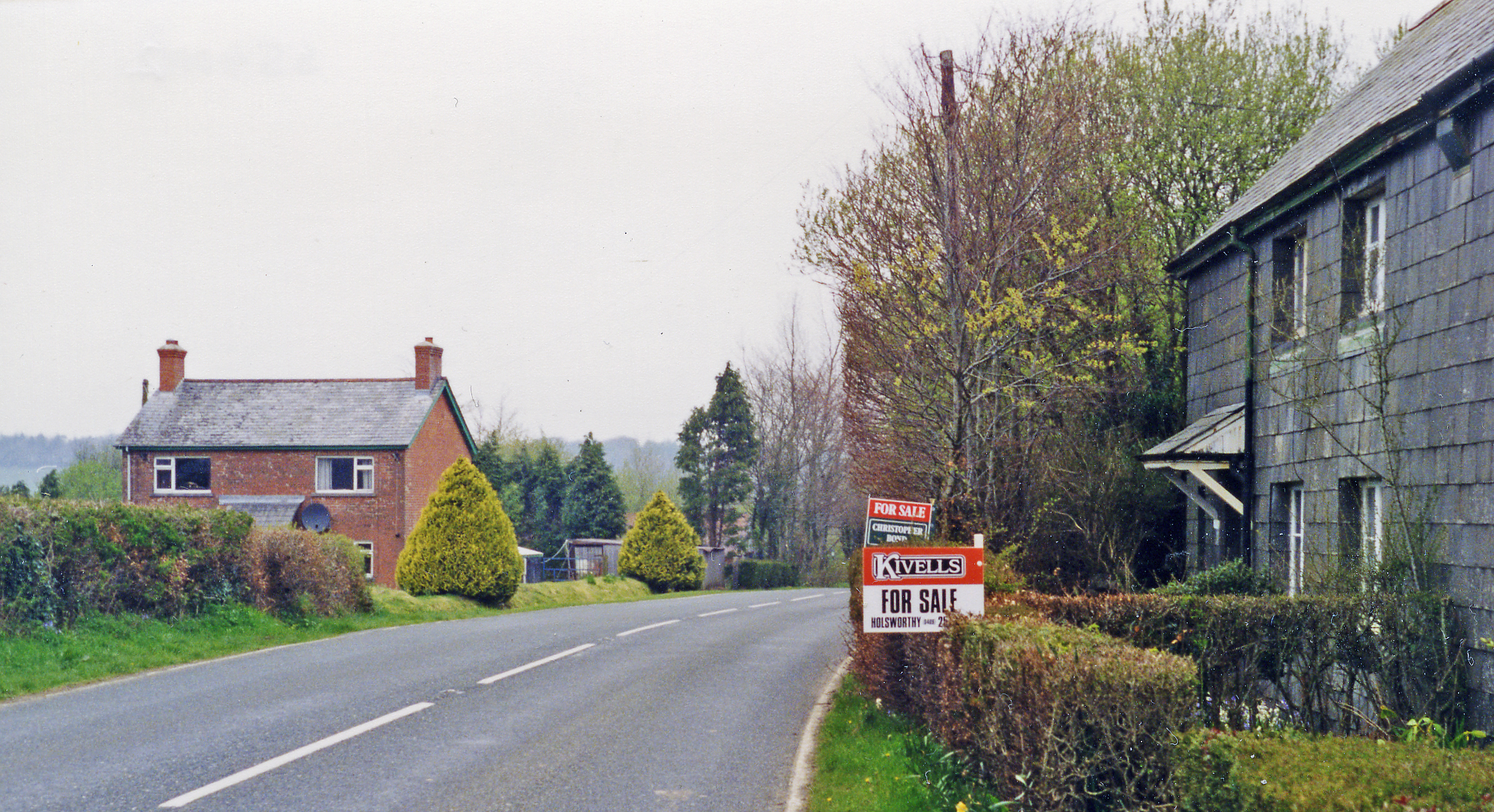
- Site of the station in 1995

General information
- Location: Dunsland Cross, Torridge; England
- Grid reference: SS4054502778
- Platforms: 2

Other information
- Status: Disused

History
- Pre-grouping: London and South Western Railway
- Post-grouping: Southern Railway; Western Region of British Railways

Key dates
- 20 January 1879: Opened
- 3 October 1966: Closed to passengers and goods
Location

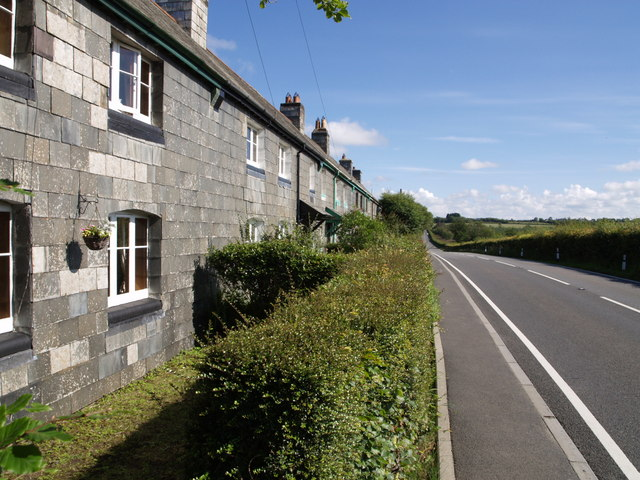
Railway cottages at Dunsland Cross station.

Dunsland Cross was a railway station on the Bude Branch that closed in 1966. Dunsland Cross station in the parish of Holsworthy was 6 miles East of the village, now town of Holsworthy. The station was opened in 1879 by the London and South Western Railway (LSWR) when Holsworthy station was the terminus of the line, some years before the route to serve the coastal town of Bude was finally opened in 1898.

The station had been proposed for closure in the Beeching Report. The station served the remote rural communities around Dunsland Cross.

== History ==
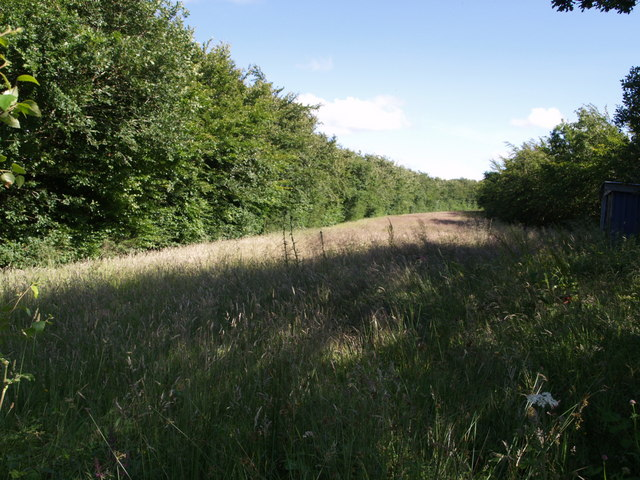
Course of the old railway near Dunsland Cross station.

The LSWR's branch line from Okehampton to Bude took nineteen years and four acts of Parliament. The original line had been authorised as far as Holsworthy where a station was opened on 20 January 1879. The Holsworthy and Bude Railway Act 1883 (46 & 47 Vict. c. ccii) was passed on 20 August 1883. However no works were commenced on the extension and the deadline for completion of the line by October 1891 was looking unlikely to be met, resulting in the LSWR asking for an extra year to complete the works. Nevertheless, since by the end of 1891 no progress had been made, a further bill was promoted seeking the abandonment of the line; the act, the Holsworthy and Bude Railway (Abandonment) Act 1892 (55 & 56 Vict. c. xx), was passed on 20 May 1892. This did not deter the residents of Stratton and Bude who, in 1894, successfully lobbied the LSWR to promote a second bill. The South Western Railway Act 1895 (58 & 59 Vict. c. cxliv) was passed on 6 July 1895 and authorised a somewhat different route than that set out in the first act.

== The station ==
The line was single track; however, a signal box with a passing loop was located here with sidings, a cattle pen and a goods shed. Several railway workers cottages were built here and these are now private dwellings (2012). The station had a ticket office and waiting room with a simple shelter on the second platform. The station name board also informed passengers that this was the station for Shebbear College.

== Services ==
Passenger services were never very frequent. The pattern of services changed after the handover of the line to the Western Region of British Railways from 1 January 1963 when services became more local and the through-coaches to Waterloo were discontinued. Bude had a local shuttle service to and from Okehampton for the final months of its existence.

== The station today ==
The station itself is a private dwelling and as stated the railway cottages survive. The hamlet has been named Dunsland Cross Station.

Preceding station	Disused railways	Following station
Halwill Junction	British Rail; Western Region; Bude Branch	Holsworthy
