= Maddaford Moor Halt railway station =

Former railway station in Devon, England

Coordinates: 50.7273°N 4.0815°W

Maddaford Moor Halt
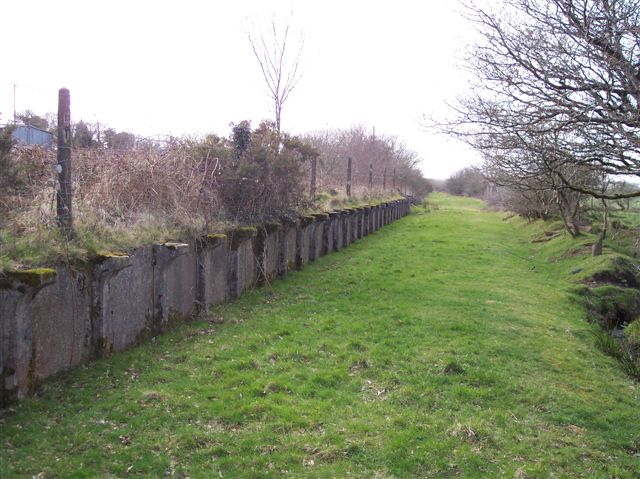
- The site of the station in 2004

General information
- Location: Thorndon Cross, West Devon; England
- Grid reference: SX5318894038
- Platforms: 1

Other information
- Status: Disused

History
- Original company: Southern Railway
- Post-grouping: Southern Railway; Western Region of British Railways

Key dates
- 26 July 1926: Opened
- 3 October 1966: Closed
Location

Maddaford Moor Halt was a railway station on the Bude Branch that closed in 1966. The halt was located where the line passed under the A3079, at a hamlet now known as Thorndon Cross, four miles west of Okehampton. Maddaford Moor Halt was opened in 1926 by the Southern Railway (SR) many years after the line to serve the coastal town of Bude was opened in 1898.

The station had been proposed for closure in the Beeching Report. Earlier name boards carried the full name of Maddaford Moor Halt for Thorndon Cross. The halt served the remote community around Maddaford Moor. A health resort had been planned, but never constructed, although some housing was built nearby.

== History ==
The LSWR's branch line from Okehampton to Bude took nineteen years and four acts of Parliament. The original line had been authorised as far as Holsworthy where a station was opened on 20 January 1879. The Holsworthy and Bude Railway Act 1883 (46 & 47 Vict. c. ccii) was passed on 20 August 1883. However no works were commenced on the extension and the deadline for completion of the line by October 1891 was looking unlikely to be met, resulting in the LSWR asking for an extra year to complete the works. Nevertheless, since by the end of 1891 no progress had been made, a further bill was promoted seeking the abandonment of the line; the act, the Holsworthy and Bude Railway (Abandonment) Act 1892 (55 & 56 Vict. c. xx), was passed on 20 May 1892. This did not deter the residents of Stratton and Bude who, in 1894, successfully lobbied the LSWR to promote a second bill. The South Western Railway Act 1895 (58 & 59 Vict. c. cxliv) was passed on 6 July 1895 and authorised a somewhat different route than that set out in the first act.

== The station ==
The line here was single tracked without any sidings, however a signal box with a passing loop had been located here from 1899 to 1921. The single concrete edged platform had a small wooden shelter.

== Services ==
Passenger services were never very frequent. The pattern of services changed after the handover of the line to the Western Region of British Railways from 1 January 1963 when services became more local and the through-coaches to Waterloo were discontinued. Bude had a local shuttle service to and from Okehampton for the final months of its existence.

== The station today ==
In 2004 the platform still stood at the station site. A bridleway now occupies the course of the old line and the remains of the railway station are still discernible.

Preceding station	Disused railways	Following station
Okehampton	British Rail; Western Region; Bude Branch	Ashbury
