= Meeth Halt railway station =

Former railway station in Devon, England

Coordinates: 50°51′07″N 4°3′59.2″W

Meeth Halt
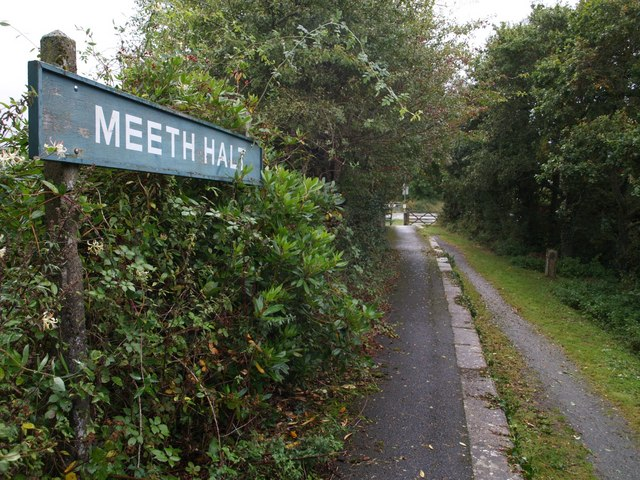
- Site of old station, now part of a long-distance footpath

General information
- Location: Meeth, West Devon; England
- Grid reference: SS546079
- Platforms: One

Other information
- Status: Disused

History
- Original company: North Devon and Cornwall Junction Light Railway
- Post-grouping: North Devon and Cornwall Junction Light Railway; Southern Region of British Railways

Key dates
- 27 July 1925: Opened
- 1 March 1965: Closed
Location

Opened in 1925, Meeth Halt was a small railway station on the North Devon and Cornwall Junction Light Railway, a private line until it became part of the Southern Region of British Railways in 1948. The line was built in part over a narrow gauge line that was used from 1881 to take ball clay from claypits at Marland and Meeth to Torrington, which was until 1925 the terminus of a branch from Barnstaple.

The line was closed to passenger traffic in 1965 as part of the Beeching proposals, but remained open for freight from the Meeth clay workings north of Meeth Halt through Torrington to Barnstaple until 1982. The station consisted of a simple short concrete platform and a stone shelter and remains as a recognisable landmark on the Tarka Trail, a very popular destination for long-distance walkers and cyclists. As a result it is in the process of a major renovation.

| Preceding station | Disused railways | Following station |
|---|---|---|
| Petrockstow | North Devon and Cornwall Junction Light Railway (1925 to 1948); Southern Region of British Railways (1948 to 1965) | Hatherleigh |

== See also ==
- Old bus by ex-Halt
- List of closed railway stations in Britain
- List of former West Country Halts
