= Hole railway station =

Former railway station in Devon, England

Coordinates: 50°48′39″N 4°10′31″W

Hole
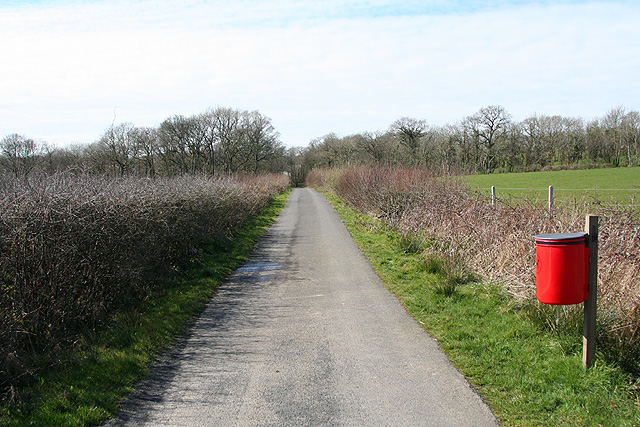
- Track approaching former station

General information
- Location: Just south west of the village of Highampton, Torridge; England
- Grid reference: SS469035
- Platforms: 2

Other information
- Status: Disused

History
- Original company: North Devon and Cornwall Junction Light Railway
- Post-grouping: North Devon and Cornwall Junction Light Railway; Southern Region of British Railways

Key dates
- 27 July 1925: Opened
- 1 March 1965: Closed
Location

Hole Railway Station was a small halt on the North Devon and Cornwall Junction Light Railway in the U.K. between Torrington and Halwill Junction, serving villages such as Black Torrington, Highampton and Sheepwash. The line, which opened in 1925, was a private line until it became part of the Southern Region of British Railways in 1948. The line closed in 1965 as part of the Beeching proposals, freight services having been withdrawn earlier on this section of the line.

Preceding station	Disused railways	Following station
Hatherleigh	North Devon and Cornwall Junction Light Railway (1925 to 1948); Southern Region of British Railways (1948 to 1965)	Halwill

== See also ==
- List of closed railway stations in Britain
- The Colonel Stephens Society
