= Yarde Halt railway station =

Former railway station in Devon, England

Coordinates: 50°54′36″N 4°08′53″W

Yarde Halt
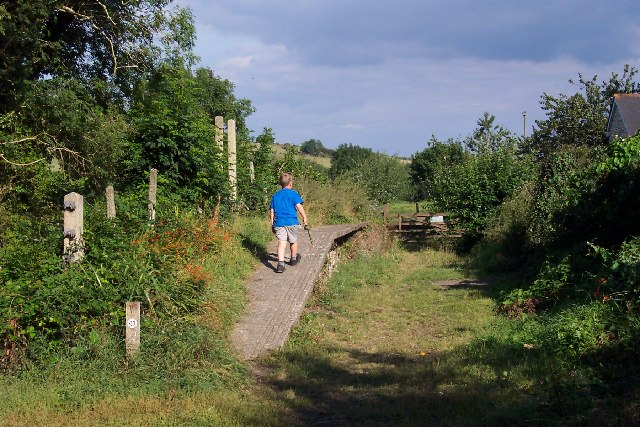
- Yarde Halt

General information
- Location: East Yarde, Torridge; England
- Grid reference: SS490145
- Platforms: One

Other information
- Status: Disused

History
- Original company: North Devon and Cornwall Junction Light Railway
- Post-grouping: North Devon and Cornwall Junction Light Railway; Southern Region of British Railways

Key dates
- 19 July 1926: Opened
- 1 March 1965: Closed for passengers
Location

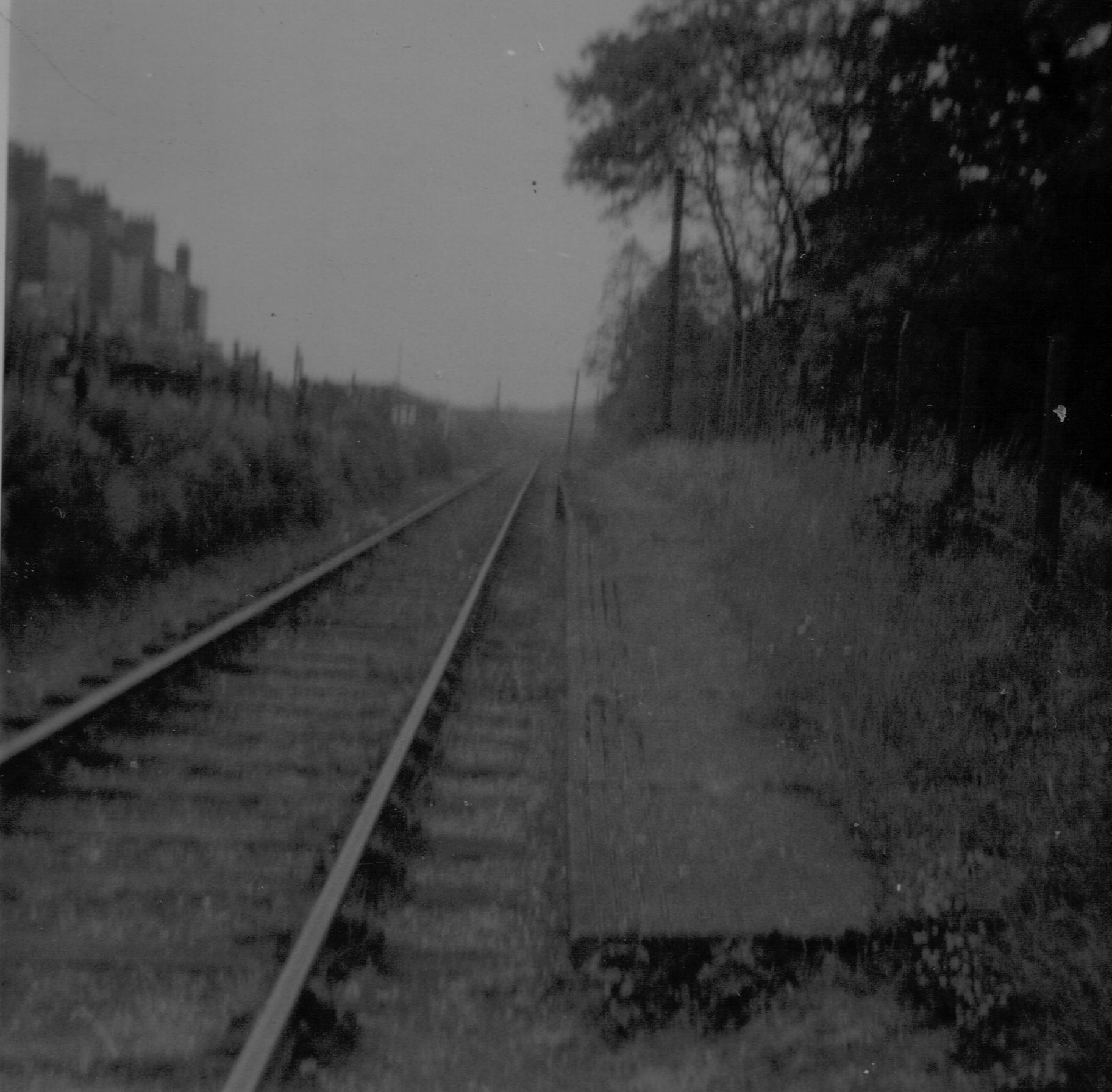
Yarde Halt in 1969

Yarde Halt railway station was an intermediate halt on the initially privately run North Devon and Cornwall Junction Light Railway, opened in 1926 to serve clay works along its route. It was closed to passengers in 1965 and now forms part of the popular Tarka trail, a route for ramblers promoted by the local council.

== See also ==
- List of closed railway stations in Britain

| Preceding station | Disused railways | Following station |
|---|---|---|
| Watergate Halt | North Devon and Cornwall Junction Light Railway (1925 to 1948); Southern Region of British Railways (1948 to 1965) | Dunsbear Halt |
