= Ashbury railway station =

Former railway station in Devon, England

Coordinates: 50°44′47″N 04°09′04″W

Ashbury
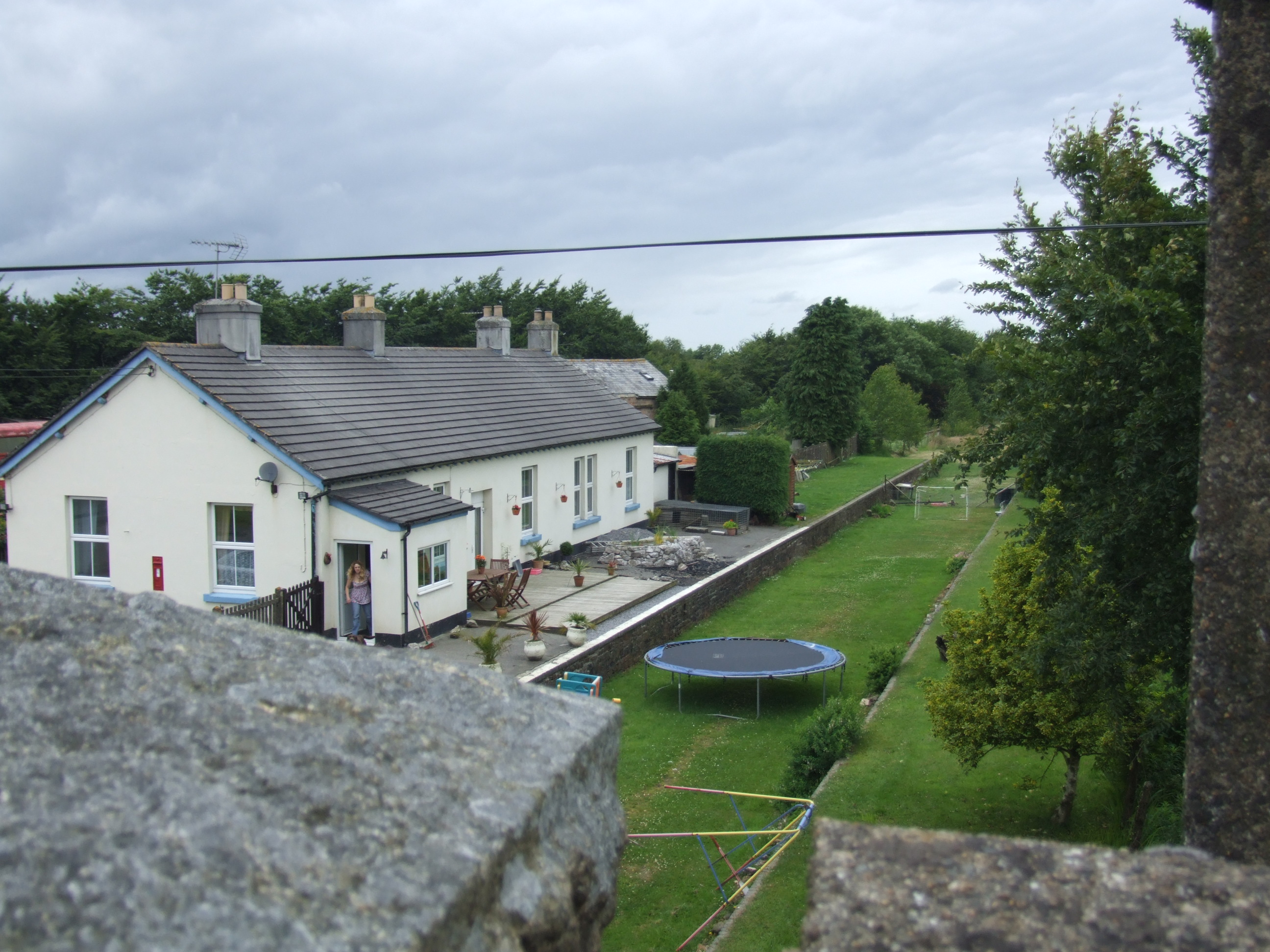

General information
- Location: Ashbury, West Devon; England

Other information
- Status: Disused

History
- Original company: London and South Western Railway
- Pre-grouping: London and South Western Railway
- Post-grouping: Southern Railway

Key dates
- 20 January 1879: Station opens as Ashbury
- April 1890: Station renamed Ashbury and North Lew
- by 4 July 1937: Station renamed Ashbury for North Lew
- BR: Station renamed Ashbury
- 3 October 1966: Station closed
Location

Ashbury railway station was located on the Okehampton–Bude line 3 3/4 miles (6.0 km) miles east of Halwill Junction, and served the hamlet of Ashbury and the village of Northlew in the English county of Devon.

== History ==
Opened by the London and South Western Railway, the station was absorbed by the Southern Railway during the Grouping of 1923, In 1948 with nationalisation the station then passed on to the Southern Region of British Railways and later Western Region of British Railways. The station was subsequently closed by the British Railways Board.

== The site today ==
Preceding station	Historical railways	Following station
Maddaford Moor Halt	Southern Railway; London and South Western Railway	Halwill Junction
