= Caroline St John-Brooks =

British journalist (1947–2003)

Dr Caroline St. John-Brooks (24 March 1947 in Oxford – 8 September 2003 in London) was an Anglo-Irish journalist and academic. She was editor of the Times Educational Supplement for three years from 1997.

== Biography ==
Caroline St. John-Brooks was born on 24 March 1947 in Oxford. The daughter of an army major and restaurant owner, she was educated privately at the Royal School in Bath, and at Thornbury grammar in Gloucestershire. She gained a BA in English Literature from Trinity College Dublin, an MA in Education from the University of Ulster at Coleraine, and a PhD in the teaching of English in secondary schools from Bristol University in 1980. After graduation, she worked as an English lecturer for eight years, first in Ireland, where she was also an education writer for the Irish Times, and then at Bristol Polytechnic.

In 1979, she became Education Correspondent for the magazine New Society, and moved to the same position at The Sunday Times in 1987. She became Assistant Editor of the Times Educational Supplement (TES) in 1990.

Between 1994 and 1997, she worked as an education researcher at the OECD in Paris; publications include Schools Under Scrutiny (1995), Mapping the Future: Young People and Career Guidance (1996) and Parents as Partners in Schooling (1997).

She returned to the Times Educational Supplement as Editor in 1997 and remained until 2000, when ill health forced her to resign. In three-and-a-half years she had modernised and expanded the paper, with new magazine sections appealing to the women who now predominated in education.

She died of breast cancer at the Royal Marsden Hospital in London in September 2003, aged 56.
