= Jean Nunn =

British civil servant (1916–1982)

Jean Nunn CB CBE
- Born: Jean Josephine Nunn; 21 July 1916; Abbotsham, Devon
- Died: 24 November 1982 (aged 66); Horsham, Sussex
- Education: Royal School for Daughters of Officers of the Army
- Alma mater: Girton College, Cambridge
- Occupation: Civil servant
- Years active: 1938 to 1970

Jean Josephine Nunn, CB, CBE (21 July 1916 – 24 November 1982) was a senior British civil servant. She served as Principal Private Secretary to James Chuter Ede and Sir David Maxwell-Fyfe, during their time as Home Secretary. She later served as Deputy Secretary of the Cabinet Office. She was the first woman to be admitted to the Order of the Bath.

== Early life ==
Nunn was born on 21 July 1916 in Abbotsham, Devon, to John Henry Nunn, and his wife, Doris Josephine Nunn (née Gregory). Her father, an officer in the Royal Field Artillery died during World War I. She was educated at St Leonard's School in Ealing, and at the Royal School for Daughters of Officers of the Army, a girls boarding school in Bath, Somerset.

In 1934, she matriculated into Girton College, University of Cambridge. She studied the History Tripos for both Part I and Part II. She graduated in 1937 Bachelor of Arts (BA), which was later promoted to Master of Arts (MA).

== Career ==
In 1938, Nunn joined the Home Office, having passed the examination for the administrative grade of Civil Service. In 1941, she was appointed private secretary to Sir Alexander Maxwell, the Permanent Under-Secretary of State of the Home Office. From 1947 to 1949, she served as Secretary to the Royal Commission on the Press.

From 1949 to 1951, she served as Principal Private Secretary to James Chuter Ede, the then Home Secretary. She was the first woman to hold this appointment. When Sir David Maxwell Fyfe became Home Secretary, she remained on as his Principal Private Secretary. In 1961, she was promoted to Assistant Under-Secretary of State and appointed head of the Children's Department. In 1963, she moved to the Cabinet Office.

In 1963, she was promoted to Deputy Secretary of the Cabinet Office. She was the first woman to be appointed to that rank. In 1970, she became ill and had to take early retirement. Had she not been, she was heading ultimately towards the leadership of one of the departments.

== Later life ==
Having retired in 1970, she spent the next few years being cared for by a friend. The illness that ended her Civil Service career was cerebral arteriosclerosis.

On 24 November 1982, after years of declining health, she died in Oakhill House Nursing Home, Horsham, Sussex. A memorial service was held for her at St Margaret's, Westminster, on 18 January 1983. Attendees included senior civil servants and politicians.

== Honours ==
In the 1966 New Year Honours, she was appointed Commander of the Order of the British Empire (CBE) for her services as Under-Secretary of the Cabinet Office. In the 1970 New Year Honours, she was appointed Companion of the Order of the Bath (CB), for her services as Deputy Secretary of the Cabinet Office. This made her the first woman to be appointed to the Order of the Bath.
