= Watergate Halt railway station =

Former railway station in Devon, England

Coordinates: 50°56′16″N 4°10′51″W

Watergate Halt
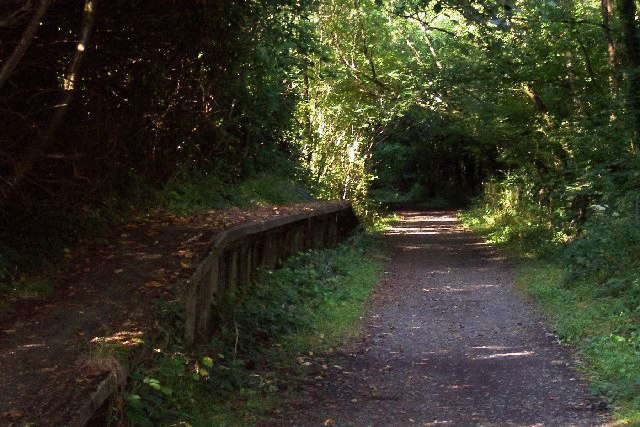
- Watergate Halt

General information
- Location: Watergate Bridge, Torridge; England
- Grid reference: SS468176
- Platforms: One

Other information
- Status: Disused

History
- Original company: North Devon and Cornwall Junction Light Railway
- Post-grouping: North Devon and Cornwall Junction Light Railway; Southern Region of British Railways

Key dates
- 20 Sept. 1926: Opened
- 1 March 1965: Closed
Location

Watergate Halt was an intermediate halt on the initially privately run North Devon and Cornwall Junction Light Railway.

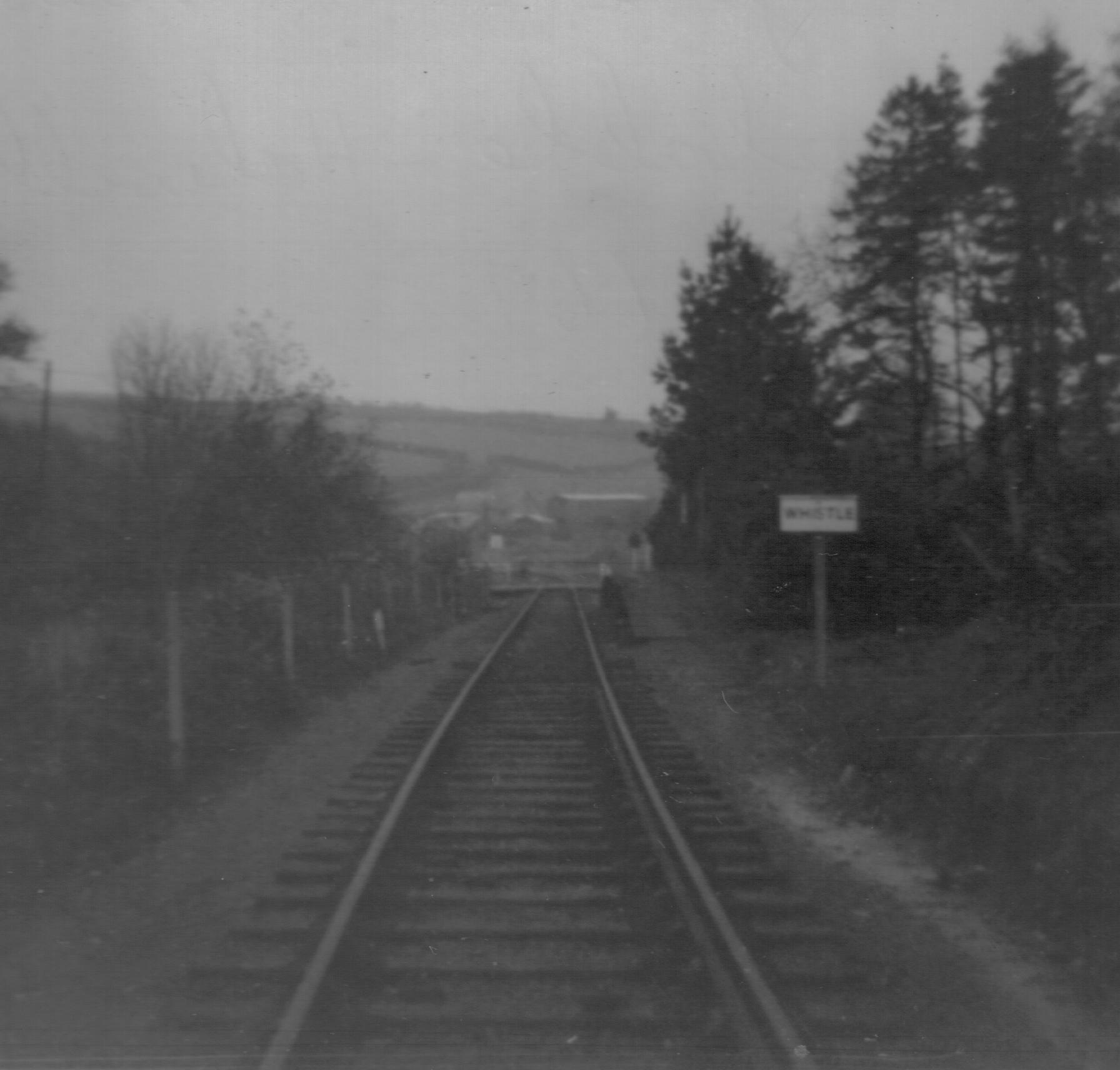
Watergate Halt in 1969 looking away from Torrington

"It was one of those moments you always remember – a first glimpse, caught through the dappled sunlight of a woodland glade. Deep within the heart of North Devon, I came across this tiny wayside halt, no longer than a single carriage length."

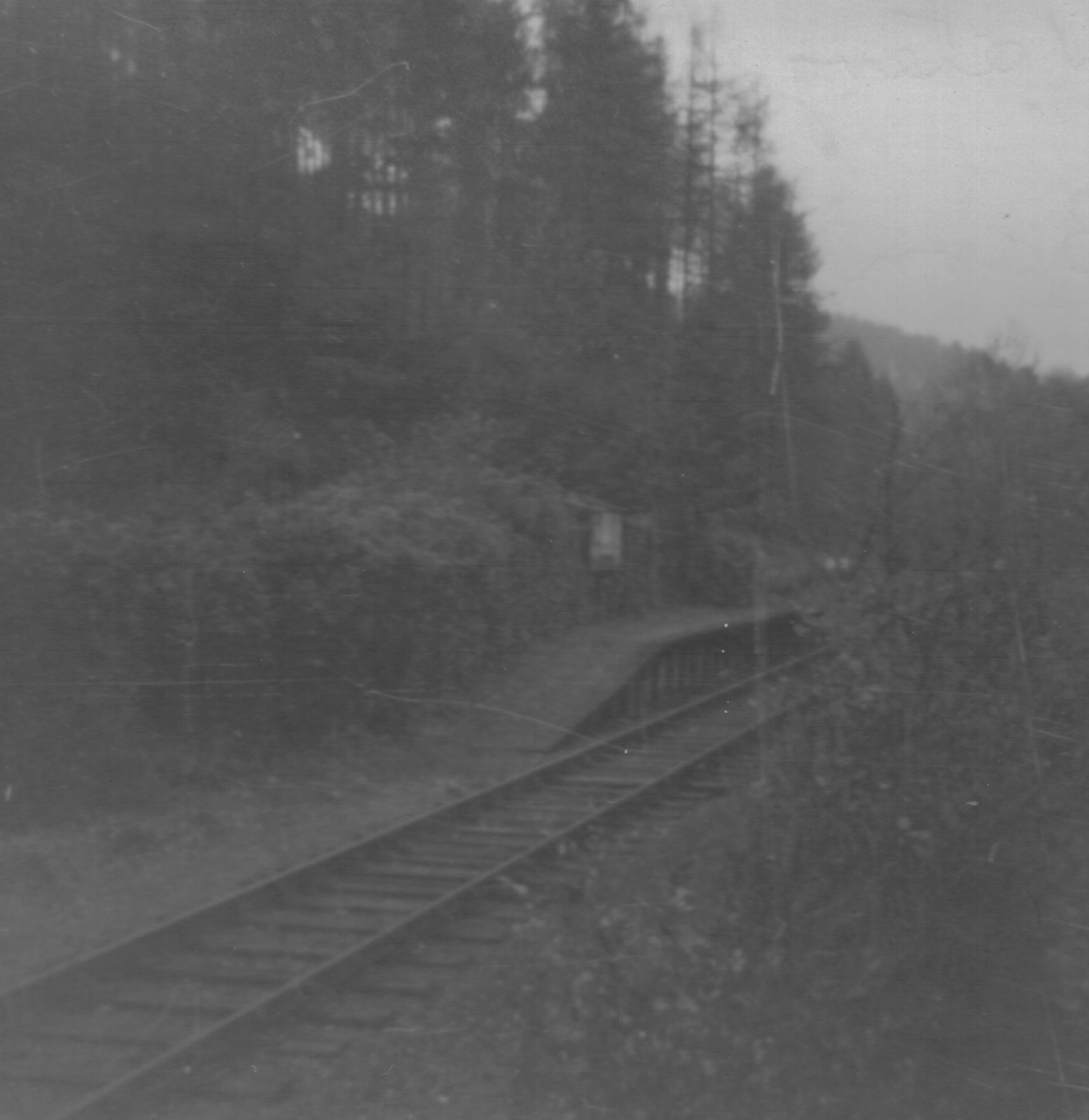
Watergate Halt in 1969 looking towards Torrington

A remote rural station with one small siding used by a local farmer, it was closed in 1965 and now forms part of the popular Tarka trail, a route for ramblers promoted by the local council.

== See also ==
- List of closed railway stations in Britain

| Preceding station | Disused railways | Following station |
|---|---|---|
| Torrington | North Devon and Cornwall Junction Light Railway (1925 to 1948); Southern Region of British Railways (1948 to 1965) | Yarde Halt |
