= Emmeline Kingdon =

English headmistress

Emmeline Maria Kingdon
- Born: 1817; Bridgerule
- Died: 25 March 1890 (aged 72–73); West Hampstead
- Occupation: headteacher

Emmeline Maria Kingdon (1817 – 25 March 1890) was an English headmistress of the Royal School for Daughters of Officers of the Army in Bath.

== Life ==
Kingdon was born in Bridgerule (probably) in 1817. Her parents were Caroline (born Nicholson) and Reverend Thomas Hockin Kingdon. Her father was a vicar and she had two brothers who followed him into that profession, taking over "his" parishes at Bridgerule and Pyworthy. The third and last brother became a barrister. Kingdon became her father's de facto housekeeper and took an interest in her village school. Her father died in 1853 and at some point she travelled (and met Florence Nightingale).

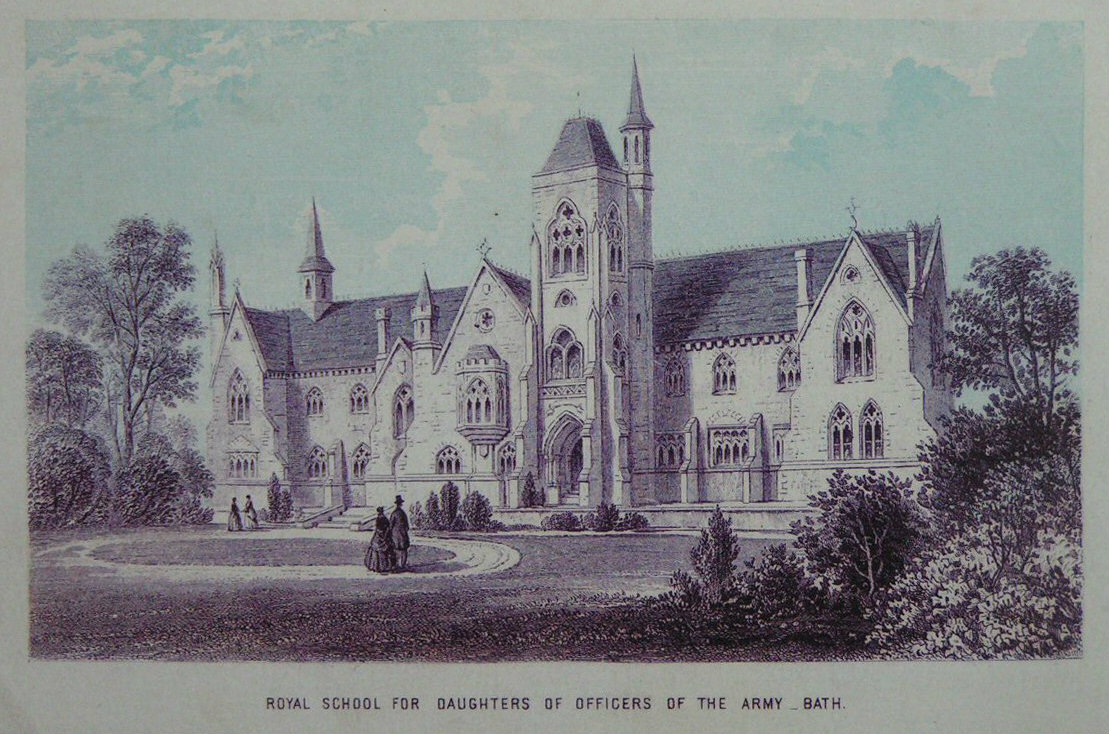
Royal School for Daughters of Officers of the Army

In 1864 the Royal School for Daughters of Officers of the Army was founded by philanthropist Alfred Douglas Hamilton. Funding came in part from Queen Victoria who was a patron. The school's mission was to provide practical and religious education for the daughters of army officers who might otherwise be unable to afford it. The school received 76 applications for the role of Lady Principal. Kingdon arranged for a letter of recommendation from Florence Nightingale and this may have been the reason she was chosen. The school had a large building identified in Lansdown near Bath and Kingdon's first task was to supervise its conversion to a boarding school. She devised a curriculum and ordered furniture, carpets, curtains, linen, crockery, and monogrammed cutlery.

There were 30 pupils when the school opened on 24 August 1865, although it quickly expanded. The school offered strict discipline and reduced rates to students where financial assistance was required. The Royal Patriotic Fund was already providing for needy families of soldiers and non-commissioned officers. This approach was modelled on that made by The Royal Naval Female School.

In 1874 she tried to retire and she was replaced by Miss Rosa Adams as head but a year later there were "problems". Kindon was asked to return and she hit the ground running as the following year some of the girls were entered for the local examinations of Cambridge University. She stayed for some years, but in 1882 she had a stroke and she was paralysed. She retired again that year. She was succeeded this time as head by Julia Mary Walker.

== Death and legacy ==
Kingdon died in West Hampstead in 1890. The school went on successfully and was merged with another school occupying this school's building.
