= Dunsbear Halt railway station =

Former railway station in Devon, England

Coordinates: 50°54′03″N 4°07′45″W

Dunsbear Halt
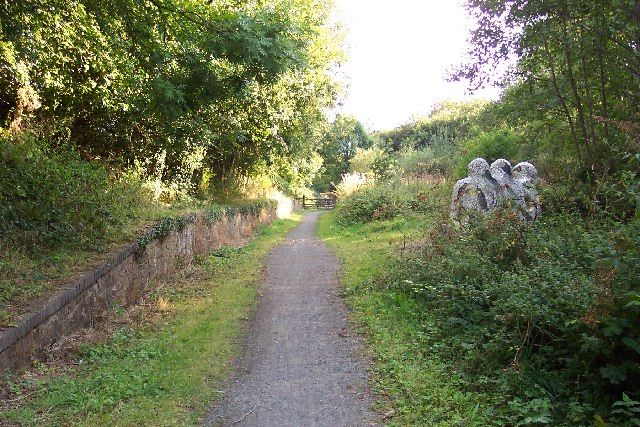
- Dunsbear Halt

General information
- Location: Colehouse Farm, Torridge; England
- Grid reference: SS503134
- Platforms: One

Other information
- Status: Disused

History
- Original company: North Devon and Cornwall Junction Light Railway
- Post-grouping: North Devon and Cornwall Junction Light Railway; Southern Region of British Railways

Key dates
- 27 July 1925: Opened
- 1 March 1965: Closed
Location

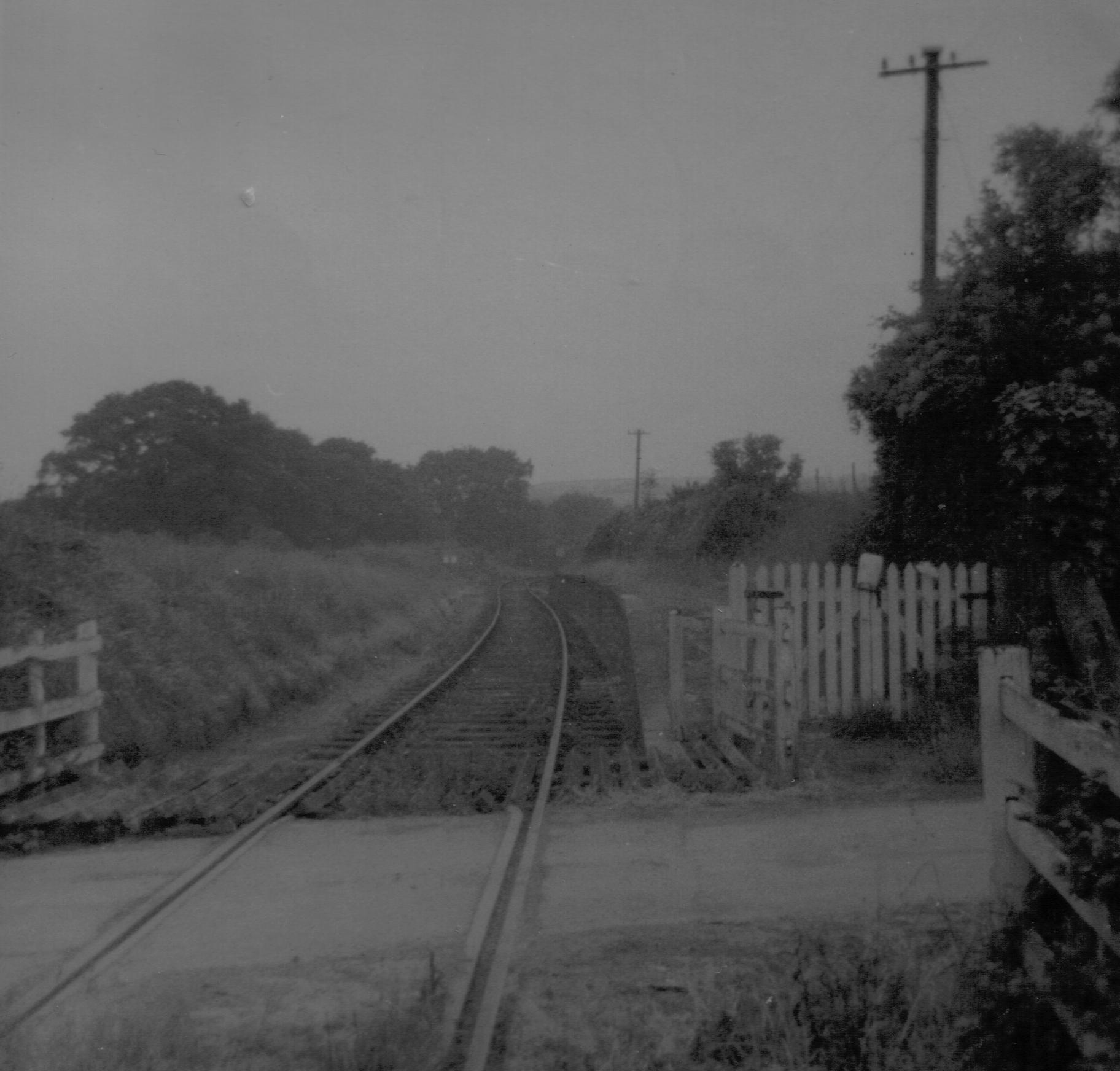
Dunsbear on 18/06/69.

Dunsbear Halt was a relatively well-used halt on the initially privately run North Devon and Cornwall Junction Light Railway. It was opened in 1925 and closed to passenger traffic 40 years later in 1965. The line remained open for freight between Barnstaple railway station and Meeth until 1982. Today, it forms part of the popular Tarka trail, and has recently been renovated by conservation volunteers.

Preceding station	Disused railways	Following station
Yarde Halt	North Devon and Cornwall Junction Light Railway (1925 to 1948); Southern Region of British Railways (1948 to 1965)	Petrockstow

== See also ==
- List of closed railway stations in Britain
- List of former West Country Halts
