= Royal School for Daughters of Officers of the Army =

Boarding school in Bath for daughters of army officers 1864 - 1998

Coordinates: 51°23′49″N 2°21′55″W

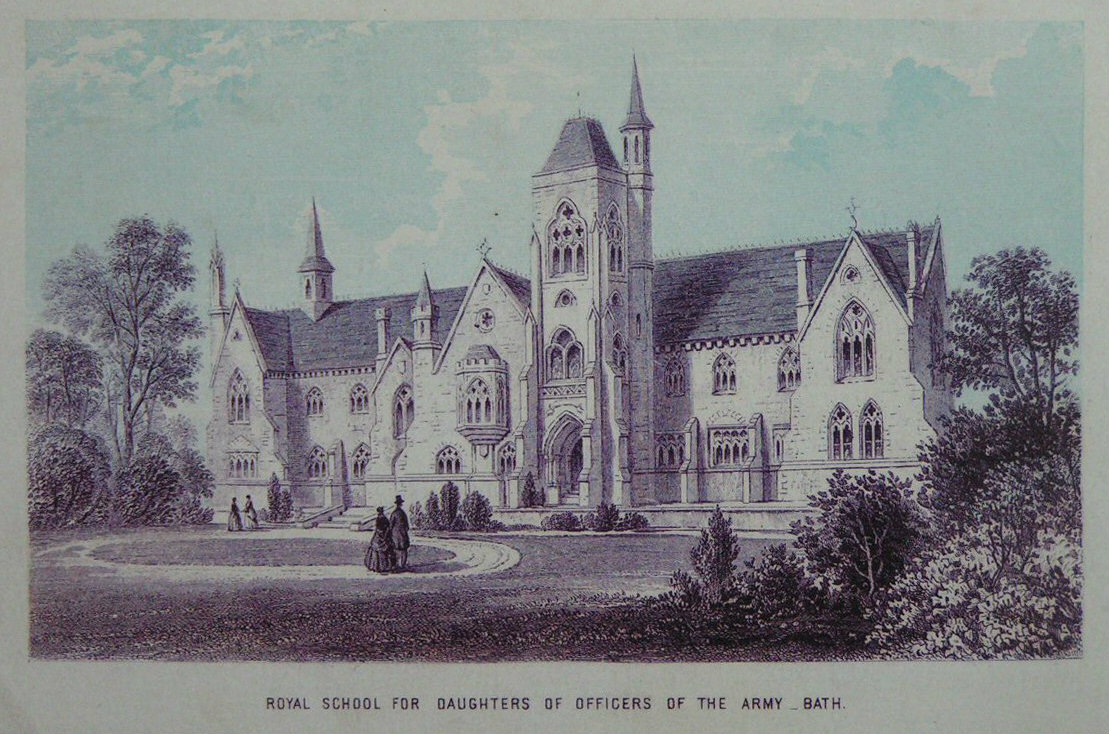
Royal School for Daughters of Officers of the Army

The Royal School for Daughters of Officers of the Army was a girls' boarding school situated in Bath, England. In 1998 it was incorporated into the Royal High School.

== Early history ==
The Royal School for Daughters of Officers of the Army grew out of the Officers' Widows and Orphans Fund, initiated by philanthropist Alfred Douglas Hamilton as a result of the Crimean War. The school was founded in 1864, and opened on 24 August 1865 under Lady Superintendent Emmeline Maria Kingdon, who was recommended by Florence Nightingale. She retired in 1882. Funding came in part from Queen Victoria, who was a patron. The school's mission was to provide practical and religious education for the daughters of army officers who might otherwise be unable to afford it. The Royal Patriotic Fund was already providing for needy families of soldiers and non-commissioned officers. The Royal Naval Female School, founded in 1840, provided assistance for the daughters of naval officers. It formed the model on which the new school was based.

The Royal School was privately funded, relying on a mixture of subscriptions, legacies and other gifts, and fees. Subscribers were eligible to vote on which girls would receive admission at reduced fees (initially twelve pounds). Larger contributors received more votes.

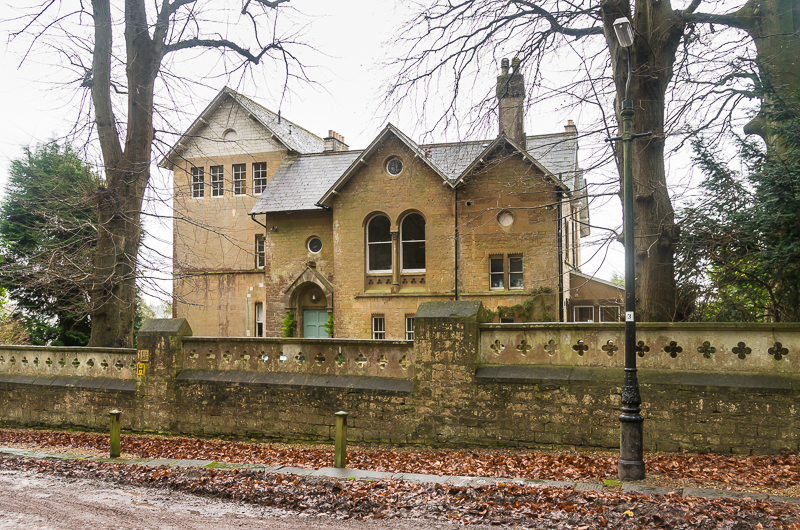
Laggan House - one of the boarding houses of the school

The school's building was originally intended to be a boys' day school. This school failed and the building, in Lansdown on the outskirts of Bath, was purchased in September 1863. A London office was maintained, initially on Cockspur Street, until a bursar was appointed at Bath after World War II.

In 1870 a junior school was opened in Clarence House at Roehampton, for girls aged ten to fourteen. However, this branch of the school struggled to achieve the standards of the parent institution. In 1885 the junior school closed and the girls transferred to Bath.

== War years ==
In September 1939, after war was declared, the school moved to Longleat and the Admiralty's Hydrographic Department took over the Lansdown premises. Significant improvisation and some construction were required to make the situation workable at Longleat. Lack of space, and difficulty in retaining domestic and teaching staff, were among many problems. However, the school remained there until the end of summer term in 1947. During this time the system of voting for foundationers was suspended, never to be reinstated. This period also saw the deaths of their host Lord Bath, a president The Duke of Connaught, and two chairmen.

== Pupils ==
The basic admission requirements at the outset were reflected in the school's name. A motion to include the word "necessitous" was defeated, but the school's aims were nevertheless charitable. Daughters of needy officers were admitted at fees of £12 per annum, significantly below cost. Other families paid more. In about 1889, for financial reasons, the committee decided to admit granddaughters of officers and, with the highest fees, daughters of civilian gentlemen. Most fathers were commissioned officers, but a few had risen from the ranks.

The normal age for admission was ten to fifteen. Girls were expected on admission to be able to read and write, and be in good health. Parents were encouraged to send their girls young. It was considered difficult to help them, if they had received only a haphazard education, as they grew older. Pupils were required to leave at the age of eighteen, except under special circumstances. The leaving age was relaxed as academic achievement and admission to university became more important, but the rule was not formally abolished until 1949.

The school was initially only open to Protestant families. This restriction prevented the school from obtaining a grant from the Royal Patriotic Fund to assist with its foundation, but was not lifted until 1920.

A significant number of places were taken by girls who had lost their fathers. In 1901, during the Boer War, 54 out of 120 pupils were fatherless. During the early decades of the school, girls came from all over the British Empire. A particularly large group was those born in India, whether to officers of the Indian Army or British Army units stationed there. When the Indian Army was disbanded in 1947, the school lost an important source of financial support.

After the return from Longleat, the school agreed in principle to accept some pupils sponsored by local education authorities but very few came. In 1949, a few day girls were admitted for the first time. A ratio of 20 day girls to 250 boarders was thought appropriate to maintain the character of the school.

== Notable alumni ==
A number of former pupils became notable in later life:

- Mary Berry (1935-), English food writer, chef, baker and television presenter.
- Sheila Gish (1942-2005), actress.
- Nina Hamnett (1890-1956), painter and illustrator.
- Jean Nunn (1916–1982), civil servant.
- Caroline St John-Brooks (1947-2003), journalist and educationalist.
- Dame Veronica Sutherland (1939- ), a career diplomat who served in government from 1965 until 1999, including a stint as Ambassador to Ireland.
- Ella Constance Sykes (1863-1939), traveller and writer.
- Cecil Woodham-Smith (1896-1977), biographer and historian.
