= Whitstone and Bridgerule railway station =

Former railway station in Devon, England

Coordinates: 50.7869°N 4.4564°W

Whitstone and Bridgerule
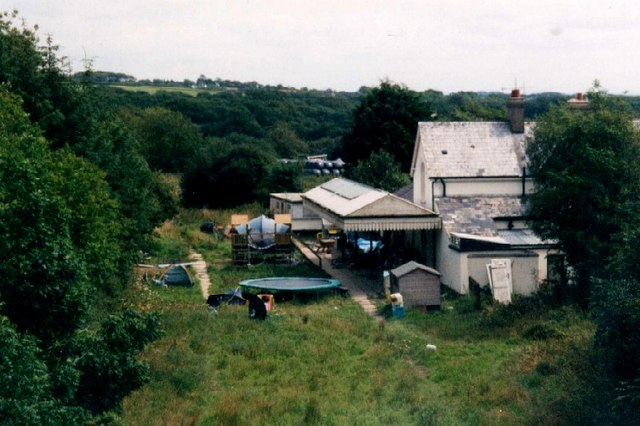
- The old station in 2004

General information
- Location: Whitstone and Bridgerule, Torridge; England
- Grid reference: SS269014
- Platforms: 2

Other information
- Status: Disused

History
- Pre-grouping: London and South Western Railway
- Post-grouping: Southern Railway; Western Region of British Railways

Key dates
- 1 November 1898: Opened
- 3 October 1966: Closed to passengers and goods
Location

Whitstone and Bridgerule was a railway station on the Bude Branch that closed in 1966. The station was opened in 1898 by the London and South Western Railway (LSWR) when the line was extended from Holsworthy station to the new terminus of the line at Bude.

The station had been proposed for closure in the Beeching Report. The station sat inconveniently between the settlements of Bridgerule in Devon and Whitstone in Cornwall.

== History ==
The LSWR's branch line from Okehampton to Bude took nineteen years and four acts of Parliament. The original line had been authorised as far as Holsworthy where a station was opened on 20 January 1879. The Holsworthy and Bude Railway Act 1883 (46 & 47 Vict. c. ccii) was passed on 20 August 1883. However no works were commenced on the extension and the deadline for completion of the line by October 1891 was looking unlikely to be met. Since by the end of 1891 no progress had been made, a further bill was promoted seeking the abandonment of the line; the act, the Holsworthy and Bude Railway (Abandonment) Act 1892 (55 & 56 Vict. c. xx), was passed on 20 May 1892. This did not deter the residents of Stratton and Bude who, in 1894, successfully lobbied the LSWR to promote a second bill. The South Western Railway Act 1895 (58 & 59 Vict. c. cxliv) was passed on 6 July 1895 and authorised a somewhat different route than that set out in the first act.

== The station ==
The line was single track, however a signal box with a passing loop was located here with sidings, a goods shed. The station had a ticket office and waiting room with a simple shelter on the second platform.

The station was unaltered from the day it was built and in 1964 still had its LSWR enamel nameplate.

The distance was 5 miles 8 chains (8.2 km) between Holsworthy and Whitstone and Bridgerule, for which passenger trains were allowed 8 minutes.

== Services ==
Passenger services were never very frequent. The pattern of services changed after the handover of the line to the Western Region of British Railways from 1 January 1963 when services became more local and the through-coaches to Waterloo were discontinued. Bude had a local shuttle service to and from Okehampton for the final months of its existence.

== The station today ==
The station itself is in private hands but still standing in an average state.

== Incidents ==
On 7 September 1950 a tractor and trailer were struck at 5.29pm by a passenger train at the Hopworthy Farm level crossing between Holsworthy and Whitstone and Bridgerule, resulting in three dead from the trailer and the tractor driver thrown over a hedge and suffering only minor injuries. The dead were the mother, father, and sister of the driver. The driver mistakenly believed that this train had already gone past and the inquiry advised that the crossing be closed. No one on the train was injured.

Preceding station	Disused railways	Following station
Holsworthy	British Rail; Western Region; Bude Branch	Bude
