= Okehampton–Bude line =

Disused railway line in Devon and Cornwall, England

The Okehampton–Bude line was a railway line built to serve Holsworthy in Devon, and Bude on the Cornish coast near the Devon border in England. The line branched from the main line at Meldon Junction to the west of Okehampton on the northern edge of Dartmoor. The line opened in 1879 to Holsworthy and in 1898 to Bude. It is now closed.

== Location ==
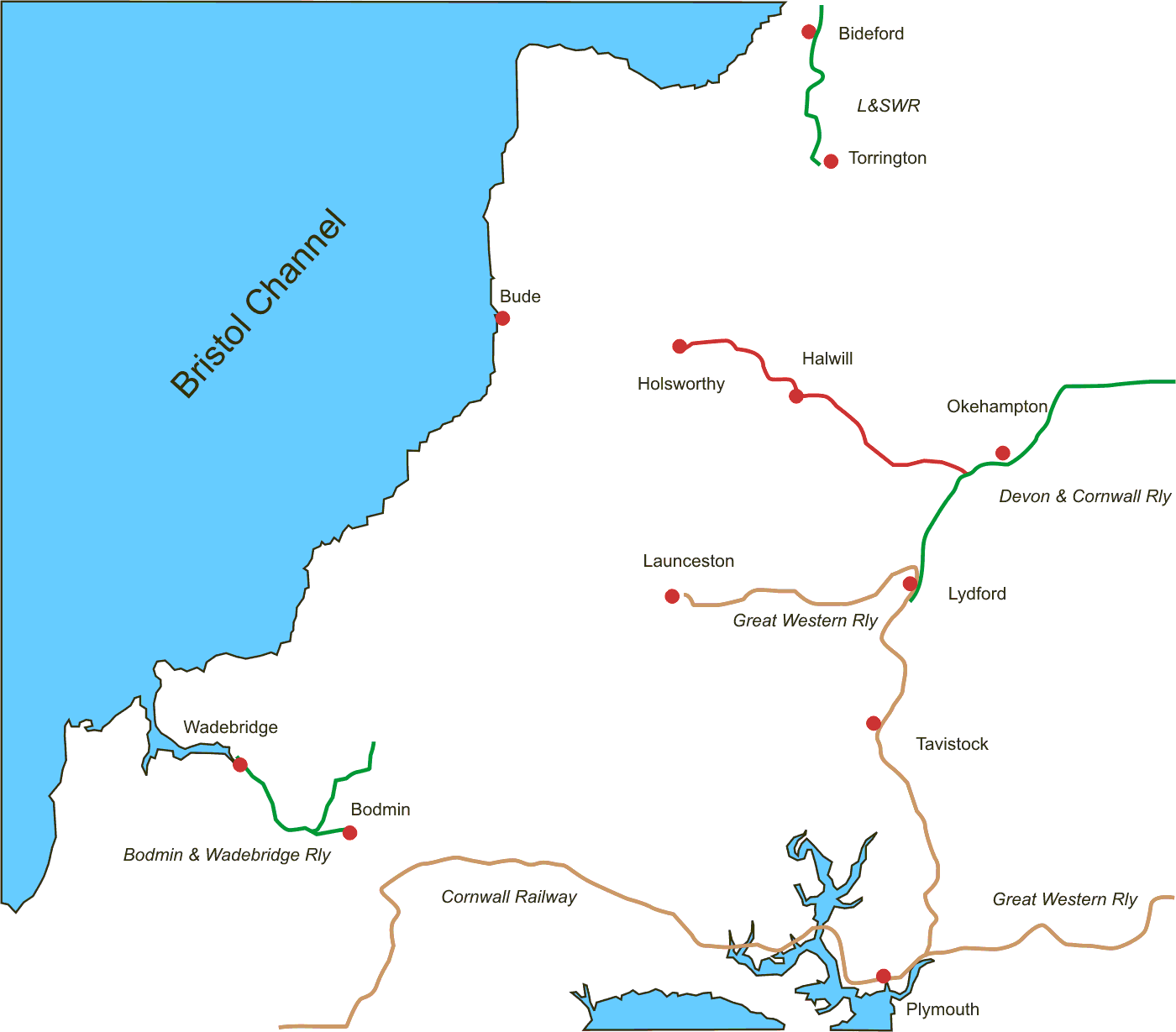
Map of the line to Holsworthy in 1879

The Bude branch diverged from the London and South Western Railway (LSWR) main line from Exeter to Plymouth at Meldon Junction (50.7111°N 4.0454°W), and ran to Bude (50.8249°N 4.5430°W) by way of Halwill and Holsworthy. It crossed hilly terrain which was largely agricultural and sparsely populated. When the line was constructed it ran from Meldon Junction to Holsworthy.

The line was extended to Bude on the Atlantic coast of Cornwall south of Hartland Point. The railway brought Bude prosperity as a watering place, and in the closing decades of the 19th century it became a holiday destination.

== Railway construction ==
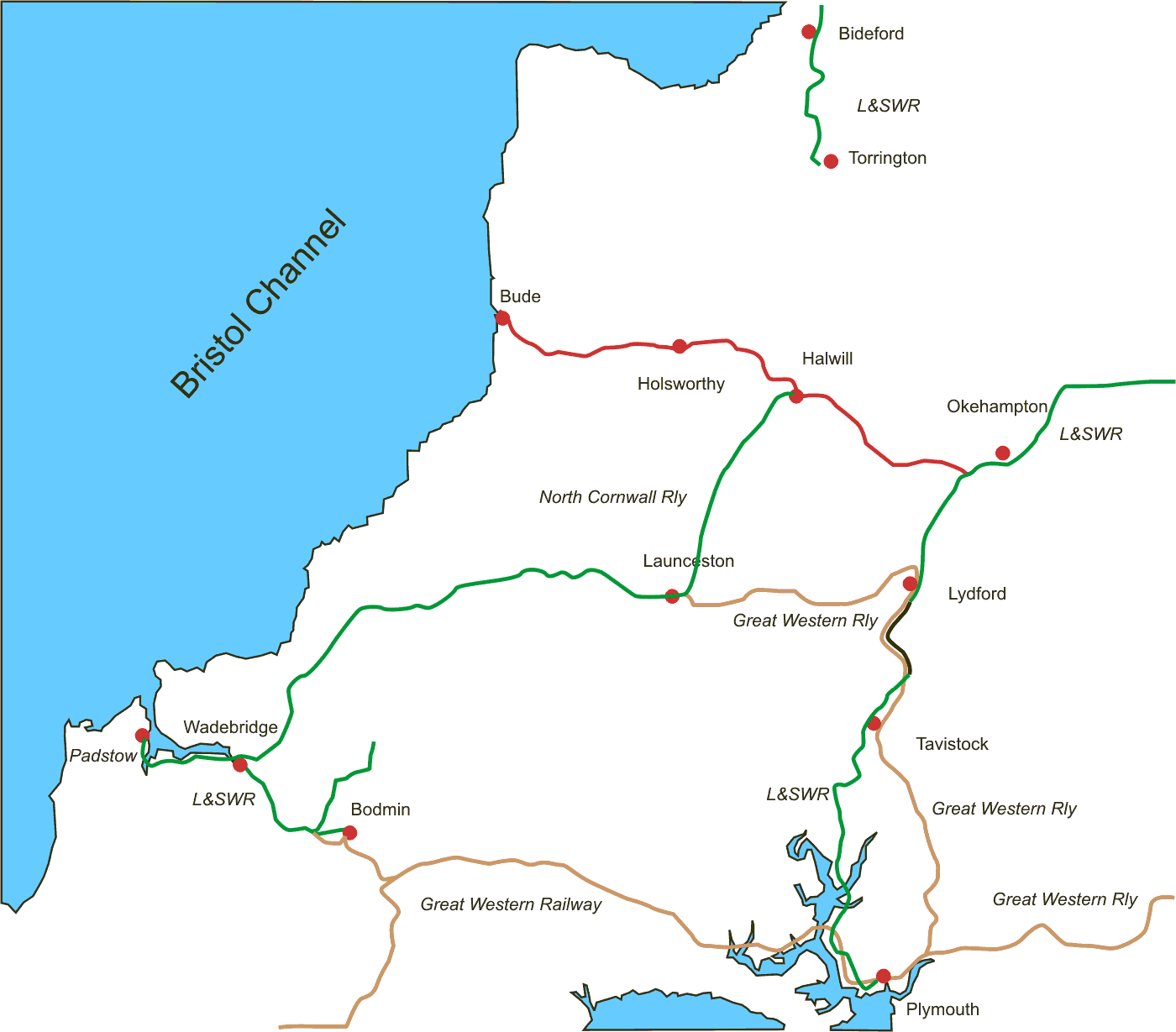
Map of the Bude line in 1898

In 1871 the Devon and Cornwall Railway reached Okehampton, giving access to the eastern network via Exeter. In 1874 the company extended its line to Lydford to access Plymouth over the Great Western Railway (GWR) branch line skirting the west of Dartmoor. A third rail was laid on the broad gauge GWR line to give the standard gauge trains access. The Devon and Cornwall line was leased and operated by the LSWR, but never owned by it.

On 20 January 1879 the LSWR opened a branch line to Holsworthy diverging from the Lydford line at Meldon Junction. At that time Bude was a small harbour town, and although it was proposed to extend the branch to the town, the LSWR did not consider it important enough to justify the cost. A coach service operated from Holsworthy station to Bude, a distance of ten miles.

In the following 19 years, Bude became a regional centre and seaside holidays gained in importance. On 10 August 1898 the line was extended to Bude following authorisation by the South Western Railway Act 1895 (58 & 59 Vict. c. cxliv), the extension being termed the 'Holsworthy and Bude Railway' by section 5 of that act. The neighbouring inland town of Stratton was considered by its residents to be more important and according to Wroe the station at Bude stopped short of the town centre to appease Stratton. A wharf siding line extended from near the station to the tidal harbour.

== Development ==
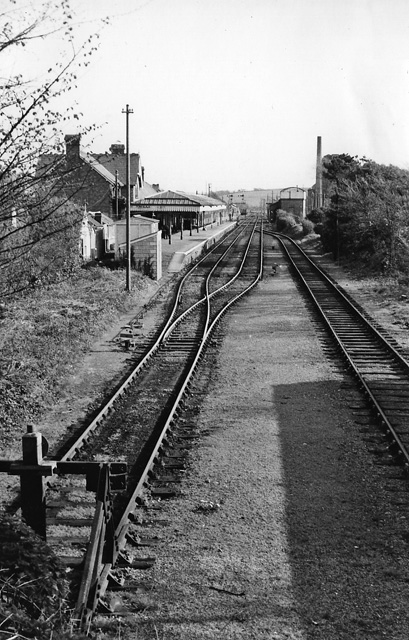
The terminus at Bude

Having reached Bude the LSWR encouraged growth of holiday passenger traffic and marketed Bude as a destination. The journey from London and the Midlands was long and although Bude developed, it never challenged the South Devon seaside towns.

Before the arrival of the railway, sea sand from Bude was used to improve the agricultural qualities of land, as it was rich in minerals, particularly lime. It was carried by the Bude Canal, and was its primary traffic. When the railway opened to Holsworthy, sand was conveyed from Bude to Stanbury Wharf by canal, and then carted a mile to Holsworthy station for onward conveyance by train. In the last decade of the 19th century, artificial fertilisers became available and brought in to the district by train and the canal fell into disuse.

In 1925 the North Devon and Cornwall Junction Light Railway opened, connecting Halwill and Torrington. Halwill Junction signal box had an unusually complex all-single-line junction, with single line operation from the Okehampton direction, onwards towards Wadebridge and Bude, and northwards towards Torrington.

The area was a major producer of meat which was transported to London and the Midlands cities. However the sparse population and lengthy and slow railway journey via Okehampton and Crediton, and the increases in car ownership and road lorry usage in the 1950s meant that traffic on the line declined.

== Closure ==
The area served by the line was sparsely populated—Mitchell records that fewer than seven tickets a day were sold at Ashbury in 1936—and passenger numbers declined steadily, especially when private car ownership became commonplace. The line closed on 1 October 1966 although it was already omitted from the Western Region timetable commencing 18 April 1966 as it has been expected to close before then, along with the route from Halwill to Wadebridge.

In January 2019, Campaign for Better Transport released a report identifying the line was listed as Priority 2 for reopening. Priority 2 is for those lines which require further development or a change in circumstances (such as housing developments).

== Route ==
From Meldon Junction:

- Maddaford Moor Halt (opened on 27 July 1926)
- Ashbury
- Halwill Junction
- Dunsland Cross
- Holsworthy
- Whitstone & Bridgerule (opened on 1 November 1898)
- Bude

Halwill was originally Halwill & Beaworthy; from March 1887 it was Halwill Junction, and finally Halwill from 1 January 1923. The station nameboard continued to be worded "Halwill for Beaworthy, Junction for Bude, North Cornwall and Torrington Lines"

Col Cobb shows a first station at Holsworthy and a second station to the east, replacing the first. This is misleading; when the line was extended from Holsworthy to Bude, re-location of sidings was necessary, but the station and the passenger platforms, remained in their original position.

There was an engine shed at Holsworthy until either 1911 or 1915.

At Bude, a long siding branch ran to the Wharf. A 4-feet gauge plateway ran on the wharf, from 1823 until 1923; it was relaid as a 2-feet gauge railway operated with horses from 1924 until 1942. The Wharf Branch closed in September 1964, after being used for rolling stock storage at busy times.

== Train service ==
In summer 1958, seven stopping trains operated from Monday to Friday between Okehampton and Bude; one conveyed through coaches from London Waterloo. The Atlantic Coast Express, a through train from Waterloo at 10:35, ran non-stop from Exeter St Davids to Halwill and called at Holsworthy arriving at Bude at 15:25. Most passenger trains from Exeter conveyed through coaches to Padstow, usually marshalled in front of the Bude coaches in the down direction. The portions were divided at Halwill.

On summer Saturdays, the same seven stopping trains operated and three of them conveyed through coaches from Waterloo. The Atlantic Coast Express had a similar stopping pattern but left Waterloo at 10:35 and arrived in Bude at 15:45.

On Sundays three trains ran each way in summer only, although before 1958 there had only been one.

Bus connections were advertised to connect with the long-distance train services, from Bude to Widemouth Bay, Stratton and Marhamchurch, operated by Southern National.

The line was transferred from the Southern Region of British Railways to the Western Region in the early sixties and train services were progressively run down after that. The last Atlantic Coast express to and from London Waterloo, which by then had been confined to summer Saturdays only, ran on 5 September 1964. The Western Region timetable for 1965 included a summer Saturday service to and from London Paddington, which last ran on 4 September 1965.

== See also ==
- Southern Railway routes west of Salisbury
