= Ashbury, Bloemfontein =

Ashbury
- Location within Free State (South African province) Location within South Africa
- Coordinates: 29°8′52″S 26°15′28″E
- Country: South Africa
- Province: Free State
- Municipality: Mangaung
- Main Place: Bloemfontein

Area
  - Total: 2.05 km^{2} (0.79 sq mi)

Population (2011)
  - Total: 11,478
  - Density: 5,600/km^{2} (14,500/sq mi)

Racial makeup (2011)
  - Black African: 14.2%
  - Coloured: 84.6%
  - Other: 1.2%

First languages (2011)
  - Afrikaans: 85.5%
  - Sotho: 5.6%
  - English: 3.2%
  - Tswana: 2.5%
  - Other: 3.2%
- Time zone: UTC+2 (SAST)
- Postal code (street): n/a
- PO box: n/a
- Area code: 051

Ashbury is a mainly Coloured suburb of the city of Bloemfontein in South Africa.
