= Joseph Ashbury =

English actor and theatrical manager

Joseph Ashbury (1638–1720), was an English actor and theatrical manager.

== Biography ==
Ashbury was born in London in 1638, into a prominent family, was educated at Eton College, and entered the army. Quartered in Ireland when the protectorate of Richard Cromwell came to an end, he was one of the officers who were dismissed under the régime of the revived Rump Parliament, and he was also one of those who, in the royalist interest, seized Dublin Castle in December 1659. At the Restoration he was rewarded by the lieutenancy of a company of foot which Charles II granted to the city of Dublin, and the new lord-lieutenant, the Duke of Ormond, made Ashbury in 1662 one of the gentlemen of his retinue and deputy master of the revels.

In 1682 he became master of the revels and patentee. The duties or privileges of the latter post seem to have been nominal, since for years the only playhouse in Dublin, the Smock Alley Theatre or Orange Street Theatre, had been closed. But Ashbury, whose first wife was the sister of an actor, seems at this time to have turned his attention to professional acting and to have given instructions in the art with eminent success. About 1674 both he and Mrs. Betterton are mentioned as teaching the Princess Anne, afterwards queen, to play Semandra in Lee's 'Mithridates,' when acted at Whitehall by persons of high rank. When, in celebration of the overthrow of the Stuart cause in Ireland, 'Othello' was acted (December 1691) at Dublin by amateurs, most of them officers of the garrison, Ashbury, who superintended the performance and played Iago, is spoken of as the only professional actor among the performers.

About the same time he engaged in London a company which included Wilks, and attempted to revive the drama in Ireland by reopening the theatre in Orange Street with 'Othello' on 23 March 1692. By skilful management and by encouraging promising histrionic talent – Booth and Quin were introduced by him to the boards - Ashbury secured for the Dublin stage a great reputation. He himself was an excellent actor, and his second wife, also an actress, gave him material assistance. Colonel Careless in the 'Committee,' and Don Quixote were among his best parts. In his 78th year he continued to act with success, and he survived to the age of 82, dying in the summer or autumn of 1720.
