= Petrockstow railway station =

Former railway station in Devon, England

Coordinates: 50.8753°N 4.1095°W

Petrockstow
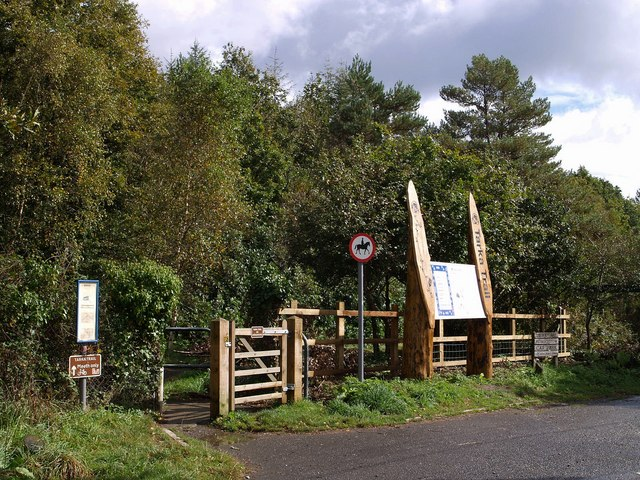
- Site of old station, now start of Tarka Trail

General information
- Location: One mile outside Petrockstowe village, Torridge; England
- Grid reference: SS516106
- Platforms: Two

Other information
- Status: Disused

History
- Original company: North Devon and Cornwall Junction Light Railway
- Post-grouping: North Devon and Cornwall Junction Light Railway; Southern Region of British Railways

Key dates
- 1925: Opened for passenger trains
- 1 March 1965: Closed
Location

Petrockstow railway station was a station serving the village of Petrockstowe in West Devon, which is about one mile away. The station was, throughout its passenger-carrying life from 1925 to 1965, spelt without the final "e" of the village name.

The railway was originally built as a narrow-gauge freight line to carry ball clay to Torrington from the Marland and Meeth clay pits. The Torrington and Marland Railway then became the basis of the northern section of the North Devon and Cornwall Junction Light Railway, which opened in 1925 and remained a private line until finally becoming part of the Southern Region of British Railways in 1948.

A victim of Beeching, the line closed to passengers in 1965 but it remained open for freight trains from the Meeth quarries which passed into the rail network through Barnstaple and Torrington until 1982.

In 2014 a small group of local railway enthusiast began clearance work at the Station, clearing the platforms and vegetation. It is hoped to partly restore the Station, in conjunction with the owners, Devon County Council.

Preceding station	Disused railways	Following station
Dunsbear Halt; Line and station closed	Southern Railway; North Devon and Cornwall Junction Light Railway	Meeth Halt; Line and station closed
