= Bude railway station =

Former railway station in Cornwall, England

Coordinates: 50.82490°N 4.54287°W

Bude Porthbud
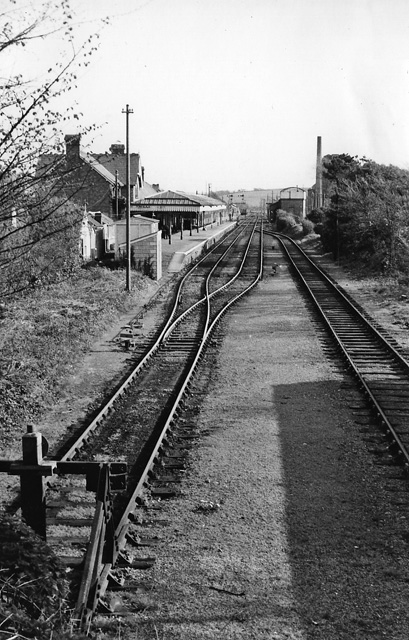
- The station in 1964

General information
- Location: Bude, Cornwall; England
- Grid reference: SS210059
- Platforms: 2

Other information
- Status: Disused

History
- Pre-grouping: London and South Western Railway
- Post-grouping: Southern Railway; Western Region of British Railways

Key dates
- 11 August 1898: Opened
- 7 September 1964: Closed to freight
- 3 October 1966: Closed to passengers
Location

Bude railway station (Cornish: Porthbud) was the western terminus of the Bude Branch. It was opened in 1898 by the London and South Western Railway (LSWR) to serve the coastal town of Bude and closed in 1966 after having been proposed for closure in the Beeching Report.

== History ==
The opening of Bude station in 1898 marked the completion of the LSWR's branch line from Okehampton which had taken nineteen years and four acts of Parliament. The original line had been authorised as far as Holsworthy where a station was opened on 20 January 1879. From there, the LSWR operated a "smart coach service" to Stratton and Bude. When the railway company showed no sign of wishing to extend services westwards towards the coast, the residents of Stratton and Bude, anxious for a connection to the expanding railway network, clubbed together in 1883 to raise £1,000 towards the cost of promoting a bill for a 9 1/2 miles (15.3 km) extension to the railway line which would follow a route taking in the two towns as well as the small village of Bridgerule.

The LSWR took up their offer and the Holsworthy and Bude Railway Act 1883 (46 & 47 Vict. c. ccii) was passed on 20 August 1883. However, apart from a ceremonial cutting of the first sod, no works were commenced on the extension and the deadline for completion of the line by October 1891 was looking unlikely to be met, resulting in the LSWR asking for an extra year to complete the works. Nevertheless, since by the end of 1891 no progress had been made, a further bill was promoted seeking the abandonment of the line; the act, the Holsworthy and Bude Railway (Abandonment) Act 1892 (55 & 56 Vict. c. xx), was passed on 20 May 1892. This did not deter the residents of Stratton and Bude who, in 1894, successfully lobbied the LSWR to promote a second bill. The South Western Railway Act 1895 (58 & 59 Vict. c. cxliv) was passed on 6 July 1895 and authorised a somewhat different route than that set out in the first act.

The LSWR was, at the time, investing heavily in the construction of the North Cornwall Line and adopted a more direct route to Bude which reduced the projected costs by some £10,000 avoiding the construction of a viaduct, but also avoiding Stratton altogether. To construct the line, the LSWR hired John Aird & Co. who were later involved in the Welsh Highland Railway.

=== Stationmasters ===
- Thomas Furze 1898 - 1924 (formerly station master at Holsworthy)
- R. J. Trigger 1924 - 1938 (formerly station master at Callington, afterwards station master at Bideford)
- Arthur M. White ca. 1939
- R. England 1947 - ca. 1950 (formerly station master at Pinhoe)

== The station ==
Bude station was deliberately sited on the outskirts of the town in order to please the residents of Stratton whose, at the time, larger town had been bypassed by the railway company. It was solidly constructed of local stone, with a refreshment room and a large bay-windowed house for the Stationmaster. From the station, a short branch was laid to the canal basin to tap the commercial traffic in sand which was used in construction, as well as to facilitate the distribution of coal which arrived in sloops from South Wales. Although traffic was heavy in the early days, the decline set in during the interwar period with the introduction of chemical fertilisers and competition from road haulage services; freight facilities were eventually withdrawn in 1964, but in reality the station saw very little traffic in its latter years. The station did not see many changes during its 68-year life, but the track layout was modified somewhat in April/May 1939 to accommodate twelve coach trains. Longer trains comprising fifteen coaches or more were handled by dividing the train between the two platforms.

Passenger services were never very frequent to Bude, although there were several useful daily through-coaches to London, with whole trains operating during Summer weekends. In addition, there was the Atlantic Coast Express, a through train from London Waterloo at 10:35, running non-stop from Exeter St Davids to Halwill, then calling at Holsworthy and Bude only, arriving at Bude at 15:25. Most trains conveyed through coaches to Padstow, usually marshalled in front of the Bude coaches in the down direction. The portions were divided at Halwill. The pattern of services changed after the handover of the line to the Western Region of British Railways from 1 January 1963 when services became more local and the through-coaches to Waterloo were discontinued. The new operator was committed to dieselisation and DMU units were introduced from September 1964, resulting in the closure of Bude's engine shed.

Bude's last direct link with London ended in Summer 1965 when the through-trains from Waterloo were diverted to London Paddington and services now reversed at Exeter St Davids. This left Bude with only a local shuttle service to and from Okehampton for the final months of its life. It was, however, the final stronghold of the Bulleid Pacifics which operated from the end of April 1962, appearing on excursion services and through-weekend trains.

The station's closure in 1966 left residents of Bude and the surrounding area with Okehampton station, some 30 miles (48 km) away, as their nearest connection to the railway. This increased to 33 miles (53 km) in January 1972 when Okehampton itself closed, leaving Barnstaple as the nearest railhead.

== The station today ==
Nothing remains of Bude Station today, except for one brick entrance pillar covered in ivy, as the site has been built over with low-cost housing, leaving the railway bridge over the River Neet as almost the sole clue as to there ever having been a railway in the town. Walking back along the route of the line, there are still a couple of sides to what would have been the bridges, and cattle creeps that can be seen adjacent to the new cycle path. The cycle path was built adjacent to the original trackbed.

== Services ==
Preceding station	Disused railways	Following station
Whitstone and Bridgerule	British Rail; Western Region; Bude Branch	Terminus
