= Ashbury, Devon =

Village in Devon, England

Coordinates: 50.76°N 04.12°W

Ashbury
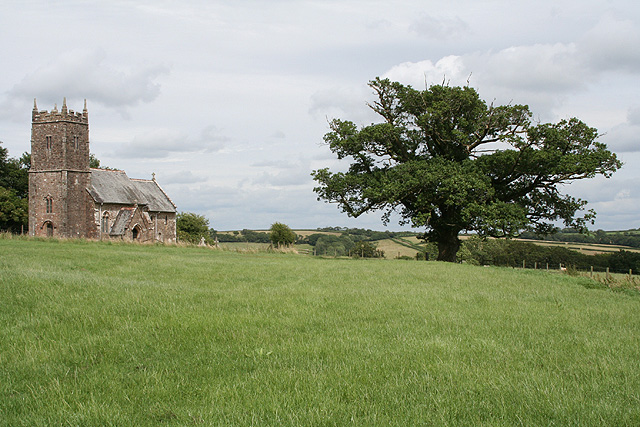
- St Mary's church

- Location within Devon
- Population: 65
- OS grid reference: SX5098
- Civil parish: Northlew
- District: West Devon
- Shire county: Devon
- Region: South West
- Country: England
- Sovereign state: United Kingdom
- Police: Devon and Cornwall
- Fire: Devon and Somerset
- Ambulance: South Western

Ashbury is a village and former civil parish, now in the parish of Northlew, in the West Devon district, in the county of Devon, England. It is 5 miles (8 km) south-west of Hatherleigh. Its population is 65.

The Church of England church in Ashbury is dedicated to St Mary. In 1912 a William Dennis, born in the village in 1886, died in the Titanic disaster. Ashbury & Northlew Golf Club (now defunct) was in existence during the 1920s (and possibly 1930s).

== History ==
According to Risdon (d.1640), the ancient name of the manor was Esseberry, meaning in Latin sedes inter fraxinos ("a seat amongst ash-trees").

In 1961 the parish had a population of 51. On 1 April 1987 the parish was abolished and merged with Northlew and Beaworthy.

== Manor ==
During the reign of King Henry III (1216-1272) the manor of Ashbury was held by William le Pouer as 2 parts of a knight's fee. During the reign of King Edward II (1307-1327) it was held by Roger de Ashberry. It was later held by the Speccot family of Speccot in the parish of Merton, Devon. Subsequently it was the seat of the Walter family from Warwickshire, whose pedigree is included in the Heraldic Visitation of Devon of 1620.

=== Woollcombe ===
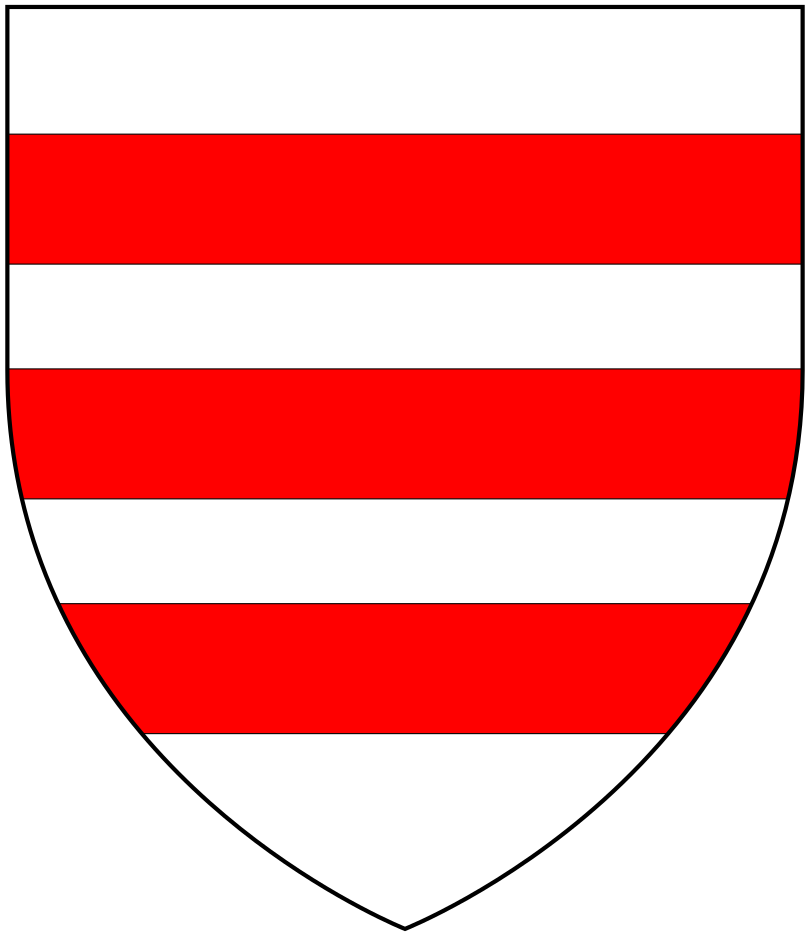
Arms of Woollcombe: Argent, three bars gules

In 1685 Elizabeth Walter, heiress of Ashbury, married Henry Woollcombe (d. 1692) a younger son of the Woollcombe family of Pitton in the parish of Yealmpton, Devon. Although the marriage was without progeny, Ashbury descended to Henry's nephew John Woollcombe (d. 1713) of Pitton, a Member of Parliament for Plymouth (1702-5) and Sheriff of Devon in 1712. He also died without progeny when Ashbury descended to his younger brother William Woollcombe (d.1718) who also died without progeny, when it descended to his nephew John Woollcombe (1720-1788) of Ashbury, Sheriff of Devon in 1751, who married Mary Morth, daughter and heiress of Jeffery Morth of Talland. His son was John Morth Woollcombe I (1747-1802) of Ashbury, whose son John Morth Woollcombe II (1783-1866), Sheriff of Devon in 1832, was the owner in 1822 who died without progeny in 1866. His younger brother was Henry Woollcombe (1784-1861), Rector of Ashbury, Highampton and Pilland, whose son was Henry Woollcombe (1813-1885), Canon Residentiary of Exeter Cathedral and Archdeacon of Barnstaple. The manor house, known as Ashbury House, burned down in 1877, together with all the parish registers which had been taken there by the rector for safekeeping. The house was finally demolished in 1934. In the parish church are monuments of the families of Walter and Woollcombe.
