= Halwill =

Village in Devon, England

Coordinates: 50°46′N 4°14′W

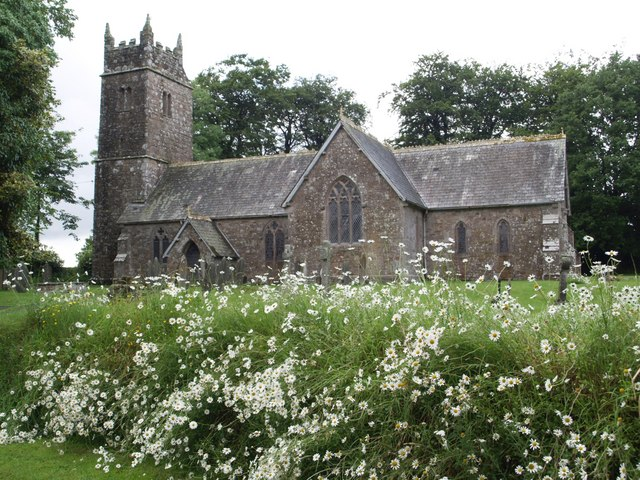
- St Peter and St James church, Halwill

- Location within Devon
- Population: 930 (2011 census)
- Civil parish: Halwill
- District: Torridge
- Shire county: Devon
- Region: South West
- Country: England
- Sovereign state: United Kingdom

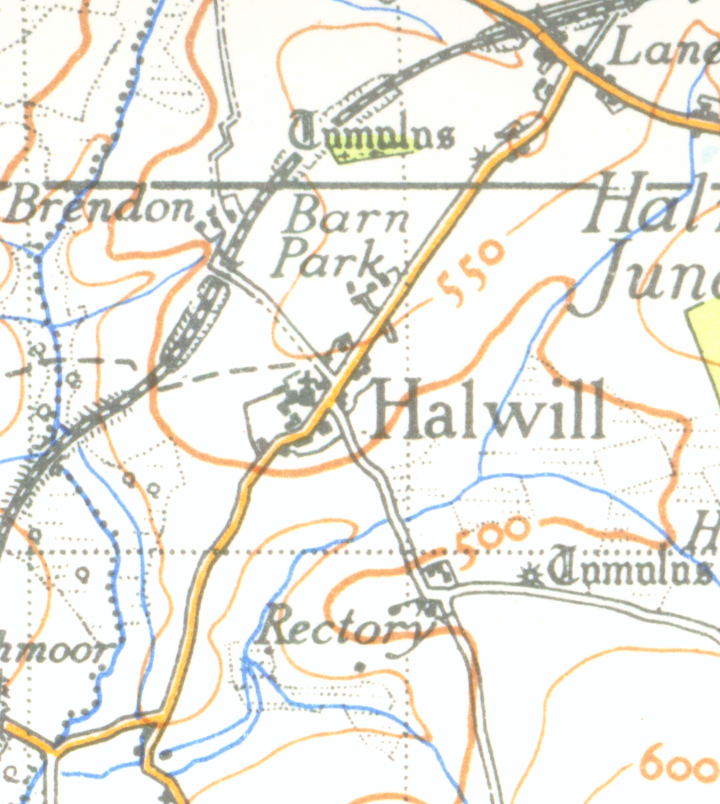
A map of Halwill from 1946

Halwill is a village and civil parish in the Torridge district, in Devon, England, just off the A3079 Okehampton to Holsworthy road. About a mile away on the main road is another settlement called Halwill Junction. In 2011 the parish had a population of 930.

This name brings to mind the former significance of the two villages, as home to an important railway junction, where the North Cornwall Railway (forming part of a main line railway from Exeter to Plymouth) diverged from the earlier Okehampton to Bude Line, see Halwill Junction railway station. Portions for the two routes separated and rejoined at Halwill station, giving the villages a much better service than larger habitations in the area.

There is a football pitch in Halwill as well as a newsagents, fish and chip shop and other shops. The local football team play on the football pitch.

== Notable people ==
- William Stanlake, recipient of the Victoria Cross
