= Rosendals Trädgård =

Park in Stockholm, Sweden

Coordinates: 59°19′37.99″N 18°6′49.08″E

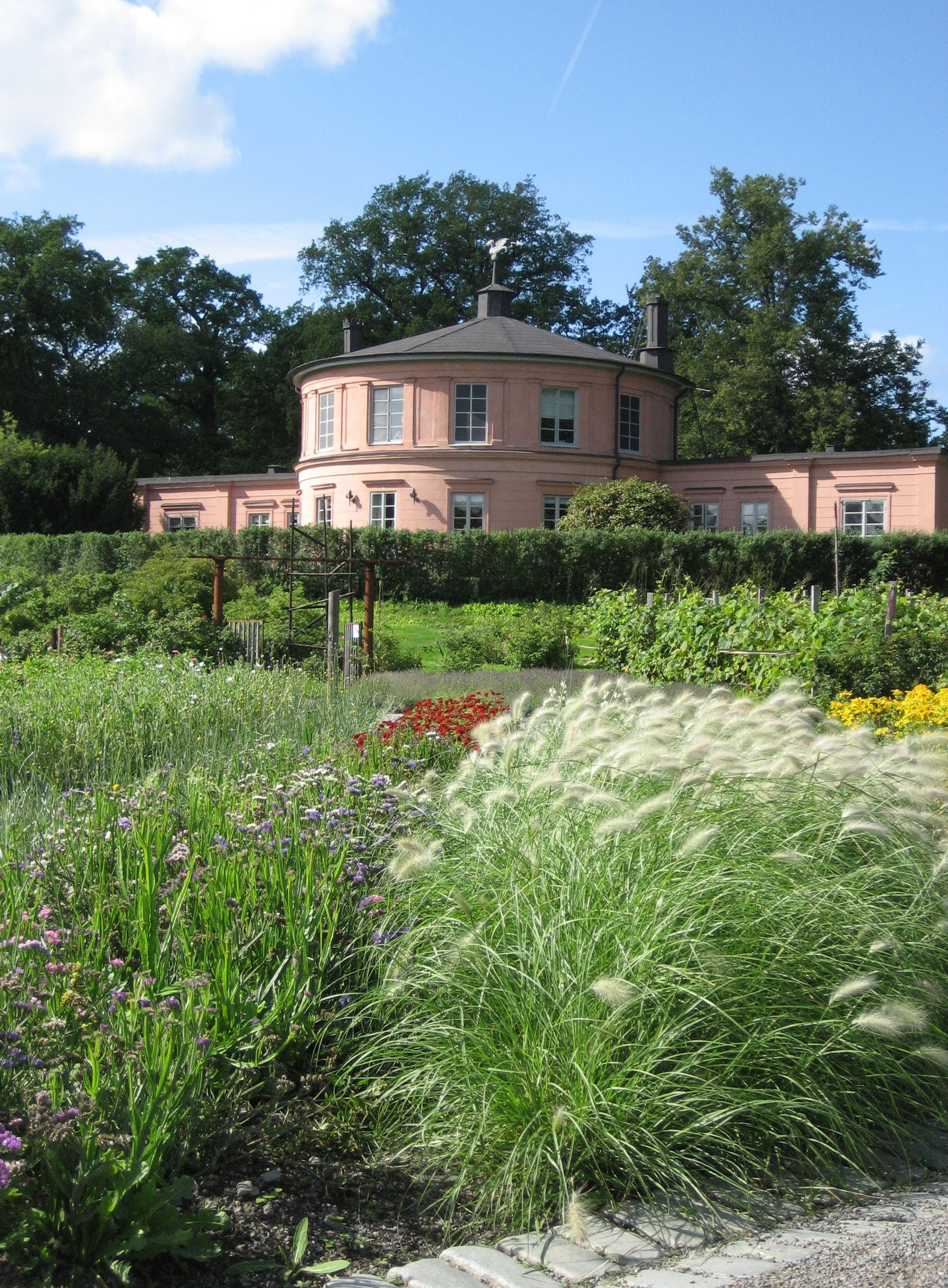
Part of Rosendals Trädgård with its orangery.

Rosendals Trädgård is a garden open to the public situated on Djurgården, west of Rosendal Palace, in the central part of Stockholm, Sweden. Today, Rosendals Trädgård is open to public visitors in order to let visitors experience nature and to demonstrate different cultural effects on gardening through history. The purpose is to practise biodynamic agriculture and pedagogical education. The garden is owned and operated by the trust fund "Rosendals Trädgårds Stiftelse". In the area known as Rosendals Trädgård there are also, except from the garden: "Plantboden", a gardening shop where the customers can find everything that's useful in a garden, "Trädgårdsbutik", a shop where the customers can buy fresh vegetables cultivated in the garden at Rosendal. The maybe most visited shop is the famous bakery, which carries the same name as the garden, "Rosendal Trädgårds bakery". Visiting Rosendals Trädgård, one has a great opportunity to experience locally cultivated and produced phenomena and items.

== History ==
The area today known as Rosendals Trädgård was in 1817 sold to the Swedish king Karl XIV Johan (Charles XIV John of Sweden), also known as Jean Baptiste Bernadotte. Bernadotte transformed the area into an English park. In 1819, the architect Fredrik Blom constructed a royal castle linked to the area known as "Rosendals Trädgård". At the same time a winter garden was also built, creating an opportunity to cultivate tropical plants even during wintertime. In 1848 the Swedish king Oscar I built an orangery, where exotic plants such as palms could be explored. The one person that has been most influential in the development of Rosendals Trädgård is probably Queen Josefina. Queen Josefina had a great interest in gardening and made it possible for the development to take place by establishing a number of plantations and greenhouses. In 1861, Queen Josefina also collaborated with the Swedish Gardening Society, something that made it possible to start a gardening-academy in the area. Together they reformed and structured the garden and its administration after their ideal, the Royal Horticultural Society in London. All the work that was implemented during Queen Josefina's lifetime led to a development that made Rosendals Trädgård flourish. During the fifty years that the garden academy was up running, the garden begun its transformation towards its current structure. Though, when the Garden academy was closed and the Swedish Garden Society ended their activity in the area, Rosendal went into a period of less activity. The Royal administration of Djurgården, who now owned the garden, demised the area for private practise and the garden transformed to several horticultural business garden. But in the late 1960s the Royal Administration of Djurgården acceded Rosendals Trädgård and restored it into its former glory of Queen Josefina.

== The Garden and its flora ==
=== The Fruit Garden ===
The fruit garden has, during the development of Rosendals Trädgård, been one of the most famous parts of the garden. Every autumn, the many different kind of apple-sorts that are represented in the almost hundred trees, becomes mature. During the Swedish Garden Society's days of glory, there were nearly 400 apple-trees in the fruit garden. During this time, Rosendals fruit garden had a big importance on the spread of fruit-trees in Sweden, since the Garden academy portioned out free plants to farmers etc. Over 24 500 fruit trees, 30 000 currant bushes, as well as 22 000 park trees was portioned out all over Sweden, something that made a greater spread of the many different apple-sorts that exist in Scandinavia possible. Other fruits, such as cherries, prunes, pears etc. are also cultivated in the fruit-garden. In Lars Krantz's book, "Rosendals Trädgård", the author (a former gardener in Rosendals Trädgård) describes the yearly-reappearing apple exhibition in Rosendals Trädgård, where almost 250-300 different apple-sorts is represented: all of them cultivated in Sweden.

=== The Rose Garden ===
The rose garden was found in 1988 and today over 100 different species are cultivated there. The rose garden is situated on a slope just beside the old orangery and is perfect for cultivating roses. Due to the harsh rose climate in Sweden Rosendals Trädgård mostly cultivate bush roses which have favourable properties, such as hardiness.

=== Roses cultivated in the garden ===
Rosa alba
Mme Legras de St Germain
Madame Plantier
Princesse de Lamballe
Maxima
Felicité Parmentier
Rosa 'Great Maiden's Blush'
Céleste
Minette
Amelia
Königin von Dänemark
Suaveolens
Gudhem

Rosa bourbonica
Honorine de Brabant
Souvenir de la Malmaison
Wrams Gunnarstorp
Coupe d' Hébé
Mme Isaac de Pereire
Champion of the World
Bourbon Queen
Louise Odier
Gruss an Teplitz
Ferdinand Pichard
Adam Messerich
Gros chou d'Hollande

Rosa centifolia
Cristata
Variegata
Fantin Latour
Major
Parvifolia
Tour de Malakoff

Rosa centifolia muscosa
Comtesse de Murinais
Salet
Jeanne de Montfort
Henri Martin
Communis
Baron de Wassenaer
William Lobb
Captaine John Ingram
Blue Boy
Nuits de Young
Rubra

Rosa gallica
Complicata
Duchesse de Montebello
Comtesse de Lacépède
Rosa Mundi
Duchesse de Verneuil
Officinalis
Duc de Guiche
Cardinal de Richelieu
Rose du Maite d'Ecole
Charles de Mills
Belle de Crécy
Tuscany
Scharlachglut
Alain Blanchard
Camaieux
Violacea
Aimable Amie
Jenny Duval
Agathe Incarnata
Duchesse d'Angoulême

Rosa × damascena
Trigintipetala
York and Lancaster
Celsiana
St Nicholas
Ispahan
La ville de Bruxelles
Mme Hardy
Blush Damask
Hebe's Lip

Rosa damascea bifera
Duchesse de Rohan
Rose des Quatre Saisons
Rose de Provins
Rose de Rescht

Rosa moschata
Felicia
Francesca

Rosa portlandica
The Portland Rose
Arthur de Sansa
Jacques Cartier
Comte de Chambord
Mme Boll

Rosa pimpinellifolia
Stanwell Perpetual
Poppius
Flore plena
Karl Förster
Aicha
Frühlingsduft

Rosa chinensis
Old Blush

Vres Roses
Schneezwerg
Thérèse Bugnet
Jens Munk
Martin Frobisher
Souvenir de Philémon Cochet

Fracofurtana Roses
Frankfurt

Remontant Roses (hybrida bifera)
Souvenir de Alphonse Lavallée
Archiduchesse Elizabeth d´Autriche

Various Origin
Forsby Herrgård
Clair Martin
Prairie Dawn
Geschwinds Nordlandrose
Rosa sancta

Climbing Roses
Seagull
Tausendschön
Mme Gregoire Stachelin
Rosa Longicuspis
White Dorothy
Dorothy Perkins
Ilse Krohn Superior
Rosa multiflora - Japanese climbing rose
Rosa arvensis – Splenden

=== The Wine Garden ===
Due to Rosendals far stretching biodynamic ideals, the wine production does of course also follows the same system of biodynamic cultivation, and the wine that is produced is called biodynamic wine. The production does not include any chemical additives, only the heat from the sun and nourishment from the earth. Today 7 different grapes are cultivated. All of them are planted around the orangery and most of the vines come from Baltic.

== The Trust Fund of Rosendals Trädgård ==
Since 1982 the Rosendals Trädgård has been operated and administrated by the trust fund of Rosendals Trädgård. The trust fund has no private economic stakeholders or interest of making profit. The only economic interest of the trust fund is to make sure that the economic return from the shops, bakery and plant house cover wages as well as house and machine maintenance. The trust fund is completely self-supporting and receives no economic contribution from the municipality.
