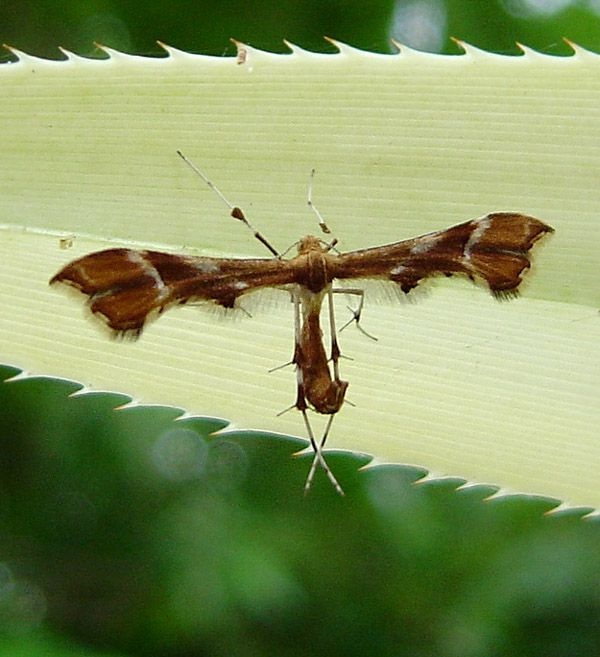

Scientific classification
- Domain: Eukaryota
- Kingdom: Animalia
- Phylum: Arthropoda
- Class: Insecta
- Order: Lepidoptera
- Family: Pterophoridae
- Genus: Cnaemidophorus
- Species: C. rhododactyla

Binomial name
- Cnaemidophorus rhododactyla ([ Denis & Schiffermüller], 1775)

Synonyms
- List: Alucita rhododactyla Denis & Schiffermüller, 1775; Platyptilia rhododactyla; Cnaemidophorus rhododactylus; Eucnemidophorus rhododactyla; Platyptilia koreana

= Cnaemidophorus rhododactyla =

Rose plume moth

Species of plume moth

Cnaemidophorus rhododactyla, also known as the rose plume moth, is a moth of the superfamily Pterophoroidea, family Pterophoridae. It is found in the Northern Hemisphere, except for Greenland, Southeast Asia, and most of North Africa. It was first described by Michael Denis and Ignaz Schiffermüller, 1775.

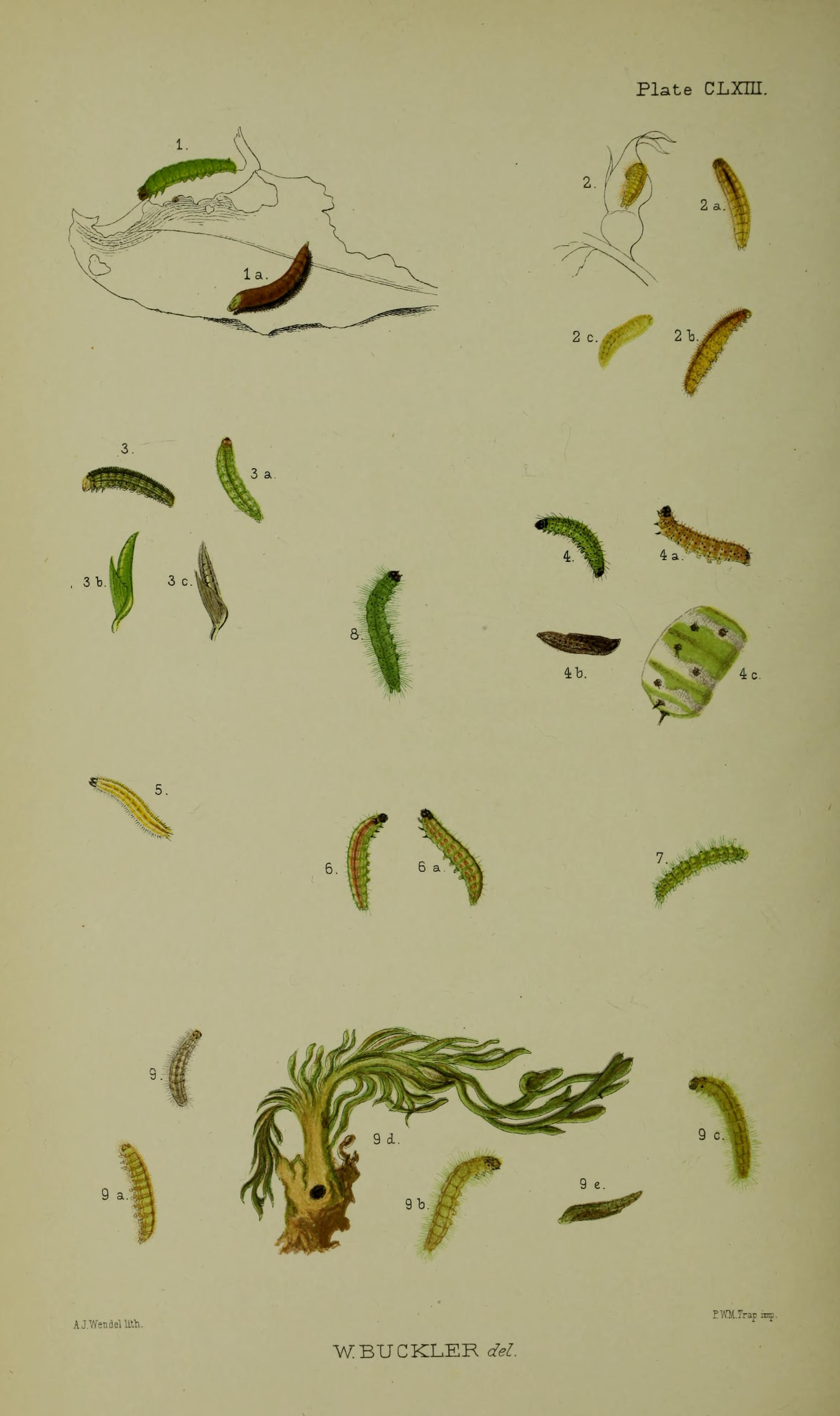
Figs.2, 2a, 2b larva after final moult, 2c pupa

== Description ==
The eggs hatch in the autumn and the larvae initially feed on leaves of roses, overwintering when small, probably in a stem. In May the larvae recommence feeding on the leaves and also flower buds and flowers. The moths fly in July and August, are attracted to light and are one of the most distinctively marked plume moths. It has a wingspan of 18–26 mm.

Larval foodplants include Japanese rose (Rosa rugosa), dog-rose (Rosa canina), glaucous dog rose (Rosa dumalis), burnet rose (Rosa spinosissima) and Rosa subcanina.
