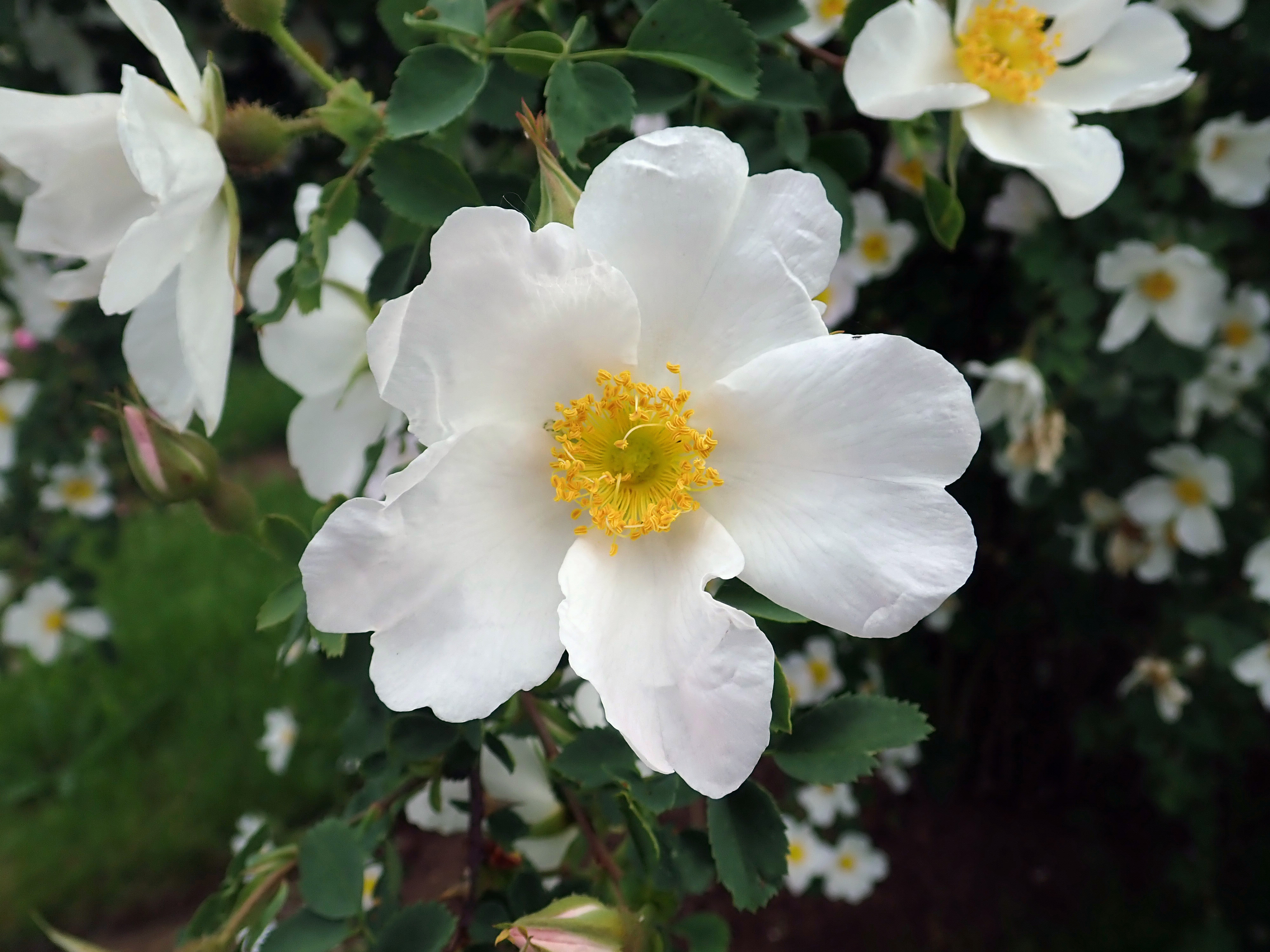
- Flowers

Scientific classification
- Kingdom: Plantae
- Clade: Tracheophytes
- Clade: Angiosperms
- Clade: Eudicots
- Clade: Rosids
- Order: Rosales
- Family: Rosaceae
- Genus: Rosa
- Species: R. fedtschenkoana

Binomial name
- Rosa fedtschenkoana Regel

= Rosa fedtschenkoana =

Species of flowering plant

Rosa fedtschenkoana is a species in the plant genus Rosa in the family Rosaceae. Some authorities consider it a synonym of Rosa webbiana. It is native to the foothills of the Ala Tau, Tian Shan and Pamir-Alai mountain ranges in central Asia and northwest China. It is named after Olga Fédchenko, a Russian botanist. It is deciduous, forming a bushy and suckering shrub up to 2.5 metres high and as much across. The branches are covered in many prickles, many of which are fine and straight, but some are thicker and slightly hooked. The pinnate leaves are pale greyish green in colour and have usually between 7 and 9 leaflets. The flowers are white, up to 5 cm across, and are borne singly or in small clusters at the tips of the branches throughout the summer months. The flowers' scent has been described as being "like 'Hovis' [brown] bread with a little blackberry jam". The flowers are followed by small, pear-shaped, bristly orange-red fruits.

Recent DNA research has discovered that R. fedtschenkoana is one of the parents of the damask group of garden roses (the other species involved being R. moschata and R. gallica). This accounts for the remontant (repeat-flowering) nature of some damasks (the autumn damasks), as R. fedtschenkoana is one of the few remontant wild roses.
