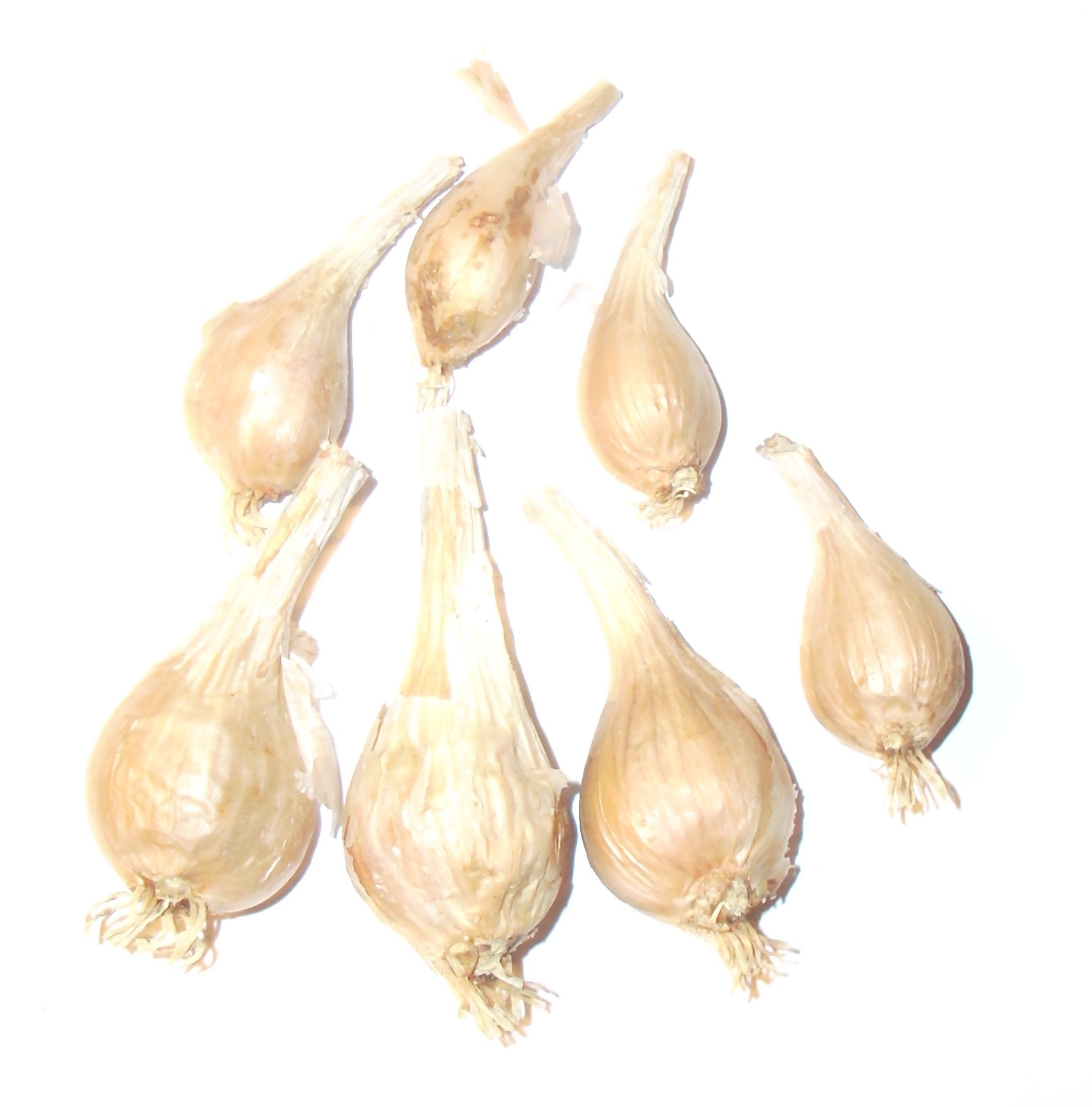

Scientific classification
- Kingdom: Plantae
- Clade: Tracheophytes
- Clade: Angiosperms
- Clade: Monocots
- Order: Asparagales
- Family: Amaryllidaceae
- Subfamily: Allioideae
- Genus: Allium
- Subgenus: A. subg. Cepa
- Species: A. oschaninii

Binomial name
- Allium oschaninii O.Fedtsch.

Synonyms
- Allium cepa var. sylvestre Regel (Heterotypic)

= Allium oschaninii =

Species of plant

Allium oschaninii, the French gray shallot, griselle or true shallot, is a perennial plant of the onion genus Allium. It forms underground bulbs much like the (French red) shallots, covered by a layer of pale brown-grey skin (hence the common name).

It is native to Northeastern Iran and Central Asia. It is widely planted in parts of southern France for culinary use.
