= Cnaemidophorus smithi =

Scientific classification
- Domain: Eukaryota
- Kingdom: Animalia
- Phylum: Arthropoda
- Class: Insecta
- Order: Lepidoptera
- Family: Pterophoridae
- Genus: Cnaemidophorus
- Species: C. smithi

Binomial name
- Cnaemidophorus smithi Gielis, 1992

Species of plume moth

Cnaemidophorus smithi is a species of moth in the genus Cnaemidophorus known from Colombia. Moths in this species take flight in June, and have a wingspan of approximately 18 millimetres.
