= Cnaemidophorus horribilis =

Scientific classification
- Kingdom: Animalia
- Phylum: Arthropoda
- Clade: Pancrustacea
- Class: Insecta
- Order: Lepidoptera
- Family: Pterophoridae
- Genus: Cnaemidophorus
- Species: C. horribilis

Binomial name
- Cnaemidophorus horribilis Gibeaux, 1996

Species of plume moth

Cnaemidophorus horribilis is a moth of the family Pterophoridae. It is known from Madagascar.
