= Cnaemidophorus urbicella =

Scientific classification
- Kingdom: Animalia
- Phylum: Arthropoda
- Class: Insecta
- Order: Lepidoptera
- Family: Pterophoridae
- Genus: Cnaemidophorus
- Species: C. urbicella

Binomial name
- Cnaemidophorus urbicella Zagulajev, 2002

Species of plume moth

Cnaemidophorus urbicella is a moth of the family Pterophoridae. It is found in Russia (Tatarstan).
