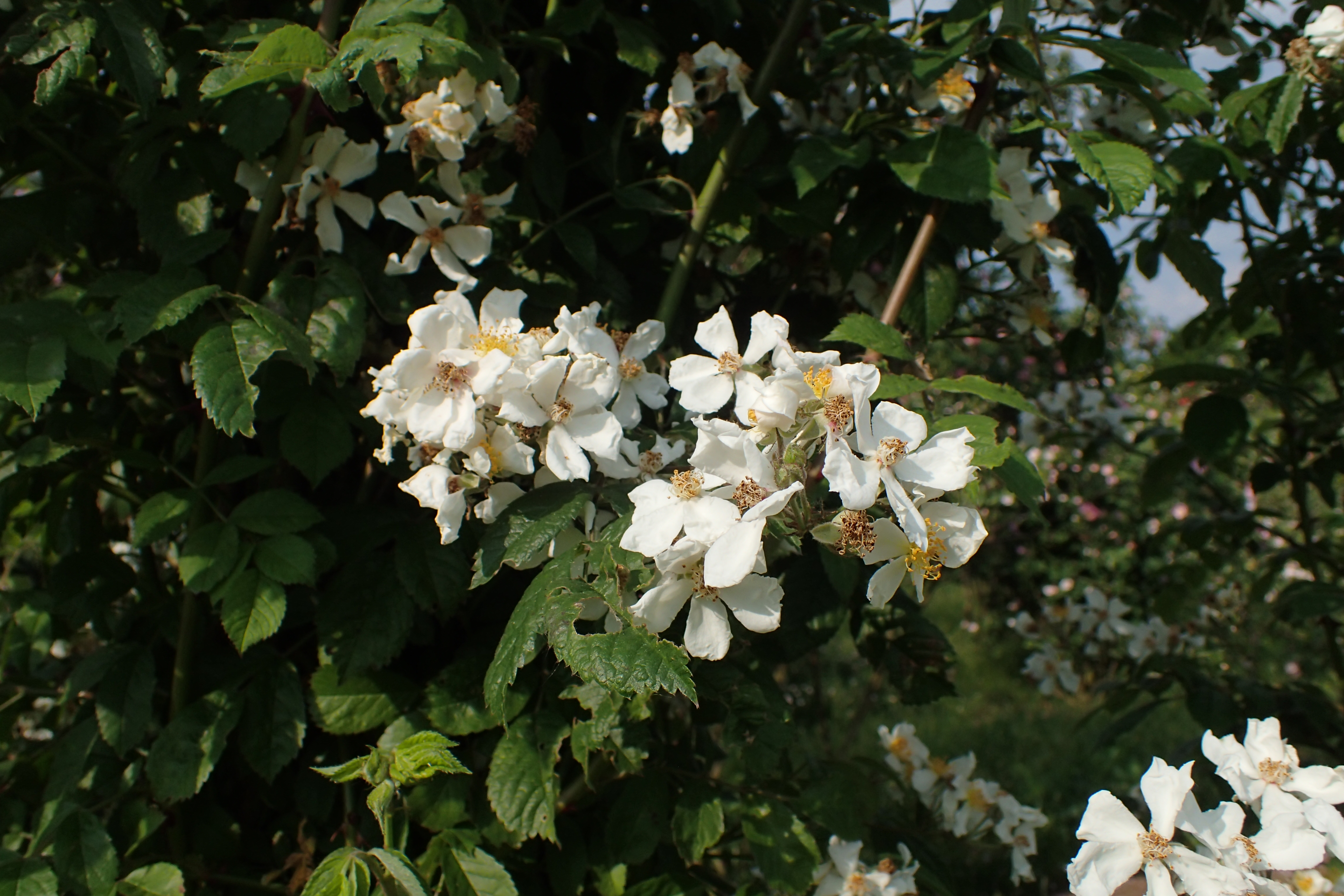
- At the Europa-Rosarium
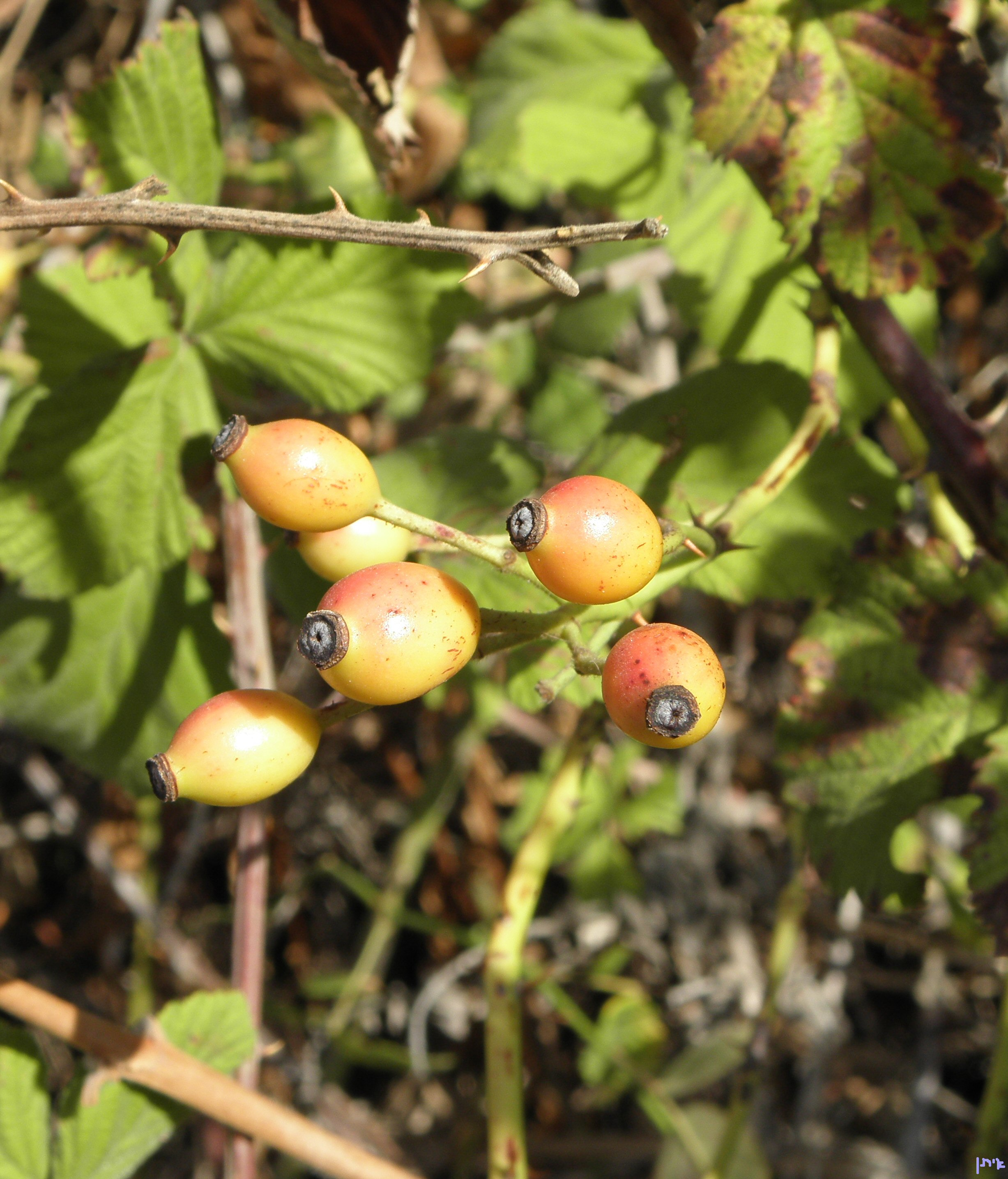
- Hips

Scientific classification
- Kingdom: Plantae
- Clade: Tracheophytes
- Clade: Angiosperms
- Clade: Eudicots
- Clade: Rosids
- Order: Rosales
- Family: Rosaceae
- Genus: Rosa
- Species: R. phoenicia

Binomial name
- Rosa phoenicia Boiss.

Synonyms
- Rosa arvensis var. trojana Boulenger; Rosa chlorocarpa Fenzl & Heinr.Braun; Rosa phoenicia var. kurdica Nábělek

= Rosa phoenicia =

Species of plant

Rosa phoenicia, the Phoenician rose, is a rambling or climbing, thorny wild rose species within the family Rosaceae. It is native to the temperate Eastern Mediterranean and the Fertile Crescent. It has been proposed as an ancestor of the Damascene rose Rosa × damascena.

== Taxonomy and history ==
The Phoenician rose was discovered and formally described by the Swiss systematic botanist Edmond Boissier in 1849. The initial description appeared in Boissier's Levantien flora survey, Diagnoses Plantarum Orientalium Novarum. Taxonomically, Rosa phoenicia is assigned to Rosa section Synstylae.

Several heterotypic synonyms have been noted in botanical catalogs:

- Rosa arvensis var. trojana Boulenger (1933), recorded from western Anatolia.
- Rosa chlorocarpa Fenzl & Heinr.Braun (1886), documented from regional herbaria in Vienna.
- Rosa phoenicia var. kurdica Nábělek (1923), collected from the montane landscapes of Kurdistan.

The specific epithet phoenicia directly refers to the ancient maritime culture and region of Phoenicia, where the type specimens were natively collected on coastal plains of modern-day Lebanon.

== Description ==
Rosa phoenicia is a deciduous, multi-stemmed rambling or climbing shrub that can scale to heights between 2.5 and 5 m (8.2 and 16.4 ft). The stems are greenish-brown and bear recurved prickles. The alternate compound leaves are imparipinnate, typically composed of five to seven ovate-oblong leaflets with sharply serrated margins and a glabrous to lightly pubescent green upper surface.

The blooming period occurs once annually in late spring and early summer, typically extending from May through July depending on local altitudes. The inflorescence is arranged in large, terminal, paniculate corymbs that produce small clusters of white flowers. Each solitary flower features five petals, measures 3 to 4 cm (1.2 to 1.6 in) in diameter, and possesses a strong, sweet fragrance. The reproductive column of fused, glabrous styles protruding directly above a deep ring of yellow stamens. In autumn, the fertilized flowers ripen into smooth, bright red-orange, spherical pseudo-fruits (hips) containing small and hard achenes.

== Distribution and habitat ==
The native distribution of Rosa phoenicia is centered on Western Asia and the Eastern Mediterranean basin. Wild populations occur across the Golan Heights, western Jordan, Lebanon, Syria, northern Iraq, and the western and southern maritime regions of Turkey. Historical records also trace its presence across the East Aegean Islands.

Ecologically, the species is a riparian specialist. It grows in damp, highly organic alluvial soils, riverbanks, marsh edges, drainage canals, and permanent mountain streams. It requires open sun to partial shade and relies on a high, constant water table to thrive. Within Levantine wetland biomes, it routinely aggregates with wild blackberry bushes (Rubus sanguineus) and common oleanders (Nerium oleander) to form thick, impenetrable hedgerows.

== Relationship to cultivated roses ==
Rosa phoenicia has been investigated as a possible contributor to the ancestry of cultivated roses, particularly the Damask rose (Rosa × damascena). Molecular analyses of Damask roses have identified a complex hybrid origin involving severial wild Rosa species.
