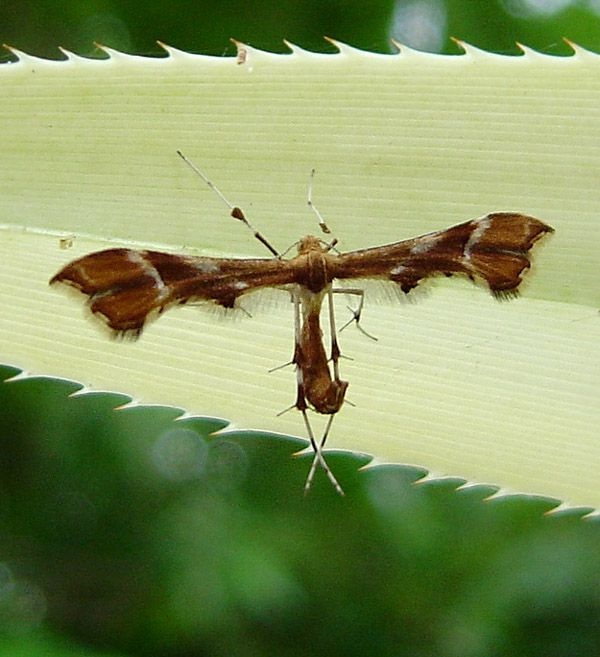
- Cnaemidophorus rhododactyla

Scientific classification
- Kingdom: Animalia
- Phylum: Arthropoda
- Class: Insecta
- Order: Lepidoptera
- Family: Pterophoridae
- Subfamily: Pterophorinae
- Tribe: Platyptiliini
- Genus: Cnaemidophorus; Wallengren, 1862

Synonyms
- Cnemidophorus Zeller, 1867 (emendation and homonym); Eucnemidophorus Wallengren, 1881 (unnecessary replacement name for unjustified emendation); Euenemidophorus Pierce & Metcalfe, 1938 (incorrect spelling)

= Cnaemidophorus =

Plume moth genus

Cnaemidophorus is a genus of plume moths in the family Pterophoridae. It was first described by Hans Daniel Johan Wallengren in 1862.

== Species ==
- Cnaemidophorus horribilis Gibeaux, 1996
- Cnaemidophorus rhododactyla (Denis & Schiffermüller, 1775) – rose plume moth
- Cnaemidophorus smithi Gielis, 1992
- Cnaemidophorus urbicella Zagulajev, 2002
