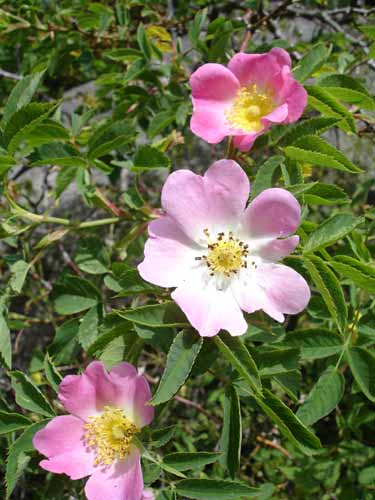

Scientific classification
- Kingdom: Plantae
- Clade: Tracheophytes
- Clade: Angiosperms
- Clade: Eudicots
- Clade: Rosids
- Order: Rosales
- Family: Rosaceae
- Genus: Rosa
- Species: R. dumalis

Binomial name
- Rosa dumalis Bechst.

Synonyms
- List: Crepinia dumalis (Bechst.) Gand. in Tab. Rhodo. Eur.: n.° 1789 (1881); Ozanonia reuteri (Godet) Gand. in Tab. Rhodo. Eur.: n.° 987 (1881); Rosa abietina f. favratii Christ in Flora 57: 475 (1874); Rosa abietina var. favratii (Christ) R.Keller in Denkschr. Schweiz. Naturf. Ges. 65: 447 (1931); Rosa abietina f. uriensis Lagger & Puget ex Christ in Rosen Schweiz: 135 (1873); Rosa acharii Billb. in J.W.Palmstruch, Sv. Bot. 9: t. 577 (1825); Rosa aciphylloides Crép. ex Cottet & Castella in Guide Bot. Cant. Fribourg: 114 (1891); Rosa afzeliana f. aciculosa R.Keller in Syn. Ros. Eur. Med.: 674 (1931); Rosa afzeliana f. aciphylloides (Crép. ex Cottet & Castella) R.Keller in Denkschr. Schweiz. Naturf. Ges. 65: 583 (1931); Rosa afzeliana subf. aciphylloides (Crép. ex Cottet & Castella) Dingler in Beibl. Bot. Jahrb. Syst. 136: 20 (1926); Rosa afzeliana var. acuticuspis R.Keller & Wilczek in Syn. Ros. Eur. Med.: 654 (1931); Rosa afzeliana f. adenocalyx R.Keller in Vierteljahrsschr. Naturf. Ges. Zürich 69(Beibl. 4): 44 (1924); Rosa afzeliana f. adenophora (Gren.) Wolley-Dod in Revis. Brit. Roses: 104 (1931); Rosa afzeliana var. adenophylla R.Keller in Vierteljahrsschr. Naturf. Ges. Zürich 69(Beibl. 4): 47 (1924); Rosa afzeliana var. albiflora Herring in Dansk. Ros.: 34 (1934); Rosa afzeliana var. amphitricha R.Keller in Syn. Ros. Eur. Med.: 650,771 (1931); Rosa afzeliana var. anatricha R.Keller in Syn. Ros. Eur. Med.: 654 (1931); Rosa afzeliana var. aostana R.Keller in Syn. Ros. Eur. Med.: 772 (1931); Rosa afzeliana var. armatissima Herring in Dansk. Ros.: 38 (1934); Rosa afzeliana f. aspera R.Keller in Syn. Ros. Eur. Med.: 676 (1931); Rosa afzeliana var. bebaeoblasta (Kupcsok) R.Keller in Bul. Grăd. Bot. Univ. Cluj 6: 42 (1926); Rosa afzeliana var. bernardensis R.Keller in Syn. Ros. Eur. Med.: 635 (1931); Rosa afzeliana f. bernardii R.Keller in Syn. Ros. Eur. Med.: 681 (1931); Rosa afzeliana f. binnensis Favrat ex R.Keller in Syn. Ros. Eur. Med.: 770 (1931); Rosa afzeliana var. biserrata (Reut.) C.Vicioso in Bol. Inst. Forest. Invest. Exp. 40: 67 (1948); Rosa afzeliana f. bornmuelleri Dingler in Beibl. Bot. Jahrb. Syst. 136: 19 (1926); Rosa afzeliana var. bovonnazensis R.Keller in Syn. Ros. Eur. Med.: 635 (1931); Rosa afzeliana var. brachypoda R.Keller in Syn. Ros. Eur. Med.: 631 (1931); Rosa afzeliana var. brevipedunculata Herring in Dansk. Ros.: 43 (1934); Rosa afzeliana var. briquetii R.Keller in Verh. Naturf. Ges. Basel 35: 64 (1923); Rosa afzeliana var. brizzii P.Rossi & R.Keller in Nuovo Giorn. Bot. Ital., n.s., 34: 1028 (1927); Rosa afzeliana f. burmiensis R.Keller in Syn. Ros. Eur. Med.: 596 (1931); Rosa afzeliana var. caryophylloides Litv. in unknown publication; Rosa afzeliana f. christianseni R.Keller in Vierteljahrsschr. Naturf. Ges. Zürich 69(Beibl. 4): 49 (1924); Rosa afzeliana f. cladoleia R.Keller in Syn. Ros. Eur. Med.: 645 (1931); Rosa afzeliana var. clavata R.Keller in Syn. Ros. Eur. Med.: 683 (1931); Rosa afzeliana var. clivicola Ravaud ex R.Keller in Syn. Ros. Eur. Med.: 633 (1931); Rosa afzeliana var. collinderi Matsson ex Almq. in Ark. Bot. 11(11): 78 (1912); Rosa afzeliana f. confinii R.Keller in Syn. Ros. Eur. Med.: 772 (1931); Rosa afzeliana var. conjungens Frid. ex Herring in Dansk. Ros.: 34 (1934); Rosa afzeliana var. convirescens Matsson ex Almq. in Ark. Bot. 11(11): 112 (1912); Rosa afzeliana var. coriacea Herring in Dansk. Ros.: 34 (1934); Rosa afzeliana f. crepiniana (Déségl. ex Baker) Wolley-Dod in Revis. Brit. Roses: 104 (1931); Rosa afzeliana var. curiosa Herring in Dansk. Ros.: 35 (1934); Rosa afzeliana var. dalvazzensis R.Keller in Syn. Ros. Eur. Med.: 653 (1931); Rosa afzeliana var. diodus R.Keller in P.F.A.Ascherson & K.O.R.Graebner, Syn. Mitteleur. Fl. 6(1): 197 (1901); Rosa afzeliana var. diversiglandulosa R.Keller in Vierteljahrsschr. Naturf. Ges. Zürich 69(Beibl. 4): 42 (1924); Rosa afzeliana f. elatophylla Matsson in Medelp. Fl.: 119 (1909), nom. nud.; Rosa afzeliana f. elatophylla Matsson ex Almq. in Ark. Bot. 11(11): 77 (1912); Rosa afzeliana var. elongata Herring in Dansk. Ros.: 37 (1934); Rosa afzeliana f. eriostyla R.Keller in Syn. Ros. Eur. Med.: 626 (1931); Rosa afzeliana var. erlevensis Herring in Dansk. Ros.: 33 (1934); Rosa afzeliana f. erubescens R.Keller in Syn. Ros. Eur. Med.: 669 (1931); Rosa afzeliana f. exarmata Crép. ex R.Keller in Syn. Ros. Eur. Med.: 770 (1931); Rosa afzeliana var. faxeana Herring in Dansk. Ros.: 43 (1934); Rosa afzeliana f. feerii R.Keller in Syn. Ros. Eur. Med.: 682 (1931); Rosa afzeliana f. fernarolii P.Rossi & R.Keller in Nuovo Giorn. Bot. Ital., n.s., 34: 1028 (1927); Rosa afzeliana f. fictitia (Kupcsok) R.Keller in Bul. Grăd. Bot. Univ. Cluj 6: 43 (1926); Rosa afzeliana var. fiessensis R.Keller in Verh. Naturf. Ges. Basel 35: 67 (1923); Rosa afzeliana var. friderichsenii Christ ex Herring in Dansk. Ros.: 43 (1934); Rosa afzeliana var. fritschii (Heinr.Braun) R.Keller in Syn. Ros. Eur. Med.: 770 (1931); Rosa afzeliana f. gaillardii R.Keller in Syn. Ros. Eur. Med.: 596 (1931); Rosa afzeliana var. gelertii Frid. ex Herring in Dansk. Ros.: 35 (1934); Rosa afzeliana var. gelmii R.Keller in Vierteljahrsschr. Naturf. Ges. Zürich 69(Beibl. 4): 50 (1924); Rosa afzeliana var. genuina (Gren.) C.Vicioso in Bol. Inst. Forest. Invest. Exp. 40: 65 (1948), not validly publ.; Rosa afzeliana subvar. glabrior Dingler in Beibl. Bot. Jahrb. Syst. 136: 21 (1926); Rosa afzeliana var. glandulipes Herring in Dansk. Ros.: 37 (1934); Rosa afzeliana var. glandulosissima Herring in Dansk. Ros.: 39 (1934); Rosa afzeliana f. glaucescens R.Keller in Vierteljahrsschr. Naturf. Ges. Zürich 69(Beibl. 4): 45 (1924); Rosa afzeliana var. grandis R.Keller in Syn. Ros. Eur. Med.: 596 (1931); Rosa afzeliana var. heteropoda Wilczek & R.Keller in Syn. Ros. Eur. Med.: 772 (1931); Rosa afzeliana var. heterotricha R.Keller in Syn. Ros. Eur. Med.: 654 (1931); Rosa afzeliana var. hispida Gelert ex Herring in Dansk. Ros.: 36 (1934); Rosa afzeliana var. holmii Matsson ex Almq. in Ark. Bot. 11(11): 117 (1912); Rosa afzeliana f. horrida R.Keller in Syn. Ros. Eur. Med.: 773 (1931); Rosa afzeliana var. horrida Herring in Dansk. Ros.: 39 (1934); Rosa afzeliana var. hyperpsilophylla R.Keller in Syn. Ros. Eur. Med.: 676 (1931); Rosa afzeliana subvar. impropria Dingler in Beibl. Bot. Jahrb. Syst. 136: 22 (1926); Rosa afzeliana var. inaequiglandulosa R.Keller in Syn. Ros. Eur. Med.: 653 (1931); Rosa afzeliana var. inaequiserrata R.Keller in Vierteljahrsschr. Naturf. Ges. Zürich 69(Beibl. 4): 49 (1924); Rosa afzeliana f. inermis R.Keller in Vierteljahrsschr. Naturf. Ges. Zürich 69(Beibl. 4): 41 (1924); Rosa afzeliana f. inermis R.Keller in Vierteljahrsschr. Naturf. Ges. Zürich 69(Beibl. 4): 47 (1924); Rosa afzeliana var. intercedens Herring in Dansk. Ros.: 42 (1934); Rosa afzeliana f. intricata Schmidely ex R.Keller in Syn. Ros. Eur. Med.: 773 (1931); Rosa afzeliana var. intromissa R.Keller in Vierteljahrsschr. Naturf. Ges. Zürich 69(Beibl. 4): 47 (1924); Rosa afzeliana var. iserana R.Keller in Syn. Ros. Eur. Med.: 629 (1931); Rosa afzeliana f. jurassica (Rouy) Wolley-Dod in Revis. Brit. Roses: 104 (1931); Rosa afzeliana var. kummeri R.Keller in Vierteljahrsschr. Naturf. Ges. Zürich 69(Beibl. 4): 46 (1924); Rosa afzeliana f. lapicidinarum (Kupcsok) R.Keller in Bul. Grăd. Bot. Univ. Cluj 6: 41 (1926); Rosa afzeliana var. lasiocarpa R.Keller in Syn. Ros. Eur. Med.: 769 (1931); Rosa afzeliana var. leventinensis R.Keller in Syn. Ros. Eur. Med.: 627 (1931); Rosa afzeliana var. lindii Herring in Dansk. Ros.: 41 (1934); Rosa afzeliana var. lophophyton R.Keller in Syn. Ros. Eur. Med.: 673 (1931); Rosa afzeliana var. marchica E.Schenk in Verh. Bot. Vereins Prov. Brandenburg 75: 173 (1934); Rosa afzeliana var. maukschii (Kit.) R.Keller in Syn. Ros. Eur. Med.: 678 (1931); Rosa afzeliana var. medelpadica Matsson ex Almq. in Ark. Bot. 11(11): 68 (1912); Rosa afzeliana var. medelpadica Matsson in Medelp. Fl.: 130 (1909), nom. nud.; Rosa afzeliana f. memorata (Kupcsok) R.Keller in Bul. Grăd. Bot. Univ. Cluj 6: 37 (1926); Rosa afzeliana var. microphylla R.Keller in P.F.A.Ascherson & K.O.R.Graebner, Syn. Mitteleur. Fl. 6(1): 198 (1901); Rosa afzeliana var. multiserrata Herring in Dansk. Ros.: 35 (1934); Rosa afzeliana var. noerholmensis Herring in Dansk. Ros.: 38 (1934); Rosa afzeliana var. oligotricha R.Keller in Vierteljahrsschr. Naturf. Ges. Zürich 69(Beibl. 4): 45 (1924); Rosa afzeliana var. ostenfeldii Herring in Dansk. Ros.: 37 (1934); Rosa afzeliana f. ovata Herring in Dansk. Ros.: 31 (1934); Rosa afzeliana var. paicheana R.Keller in Syn. Ros. Eur. Med.: 683 (1931); Rosa afzeliana var. parcepilosa Herring in Dansk. Ros.: 41 (1934); Rosa afzeliana f. parthenensis R.Keller in Beitr. Rosenfl. Vorarlbergs: 101 (1928); Rosa afzeliana f. parvifolia Herring in Dansk. Ros.: 32 (1934); Rosa afzeliana var. paupercula Herring in Dansk. Ros.: 33 (1934); Rosa afzeliana var. pedemontana R.Keller in Syn. Ros. Eur. Med.: 677 (1931); Rosa afzeliana var. pedunculata Litv. in unknown publication; Rosa afzeliana var. perserrata R.Keller in Syn. Ros. Eur. Med.: 682 (1931); Rosa afzeliana f. perversa (Kupcsok) R.Keller in Bul. Grăd. Bot. Univ. Cluj 6: 36 (1926); Rosa afzeliana f. phalacrostigma R.Keller in Syn. Ros. Eur. Med.: 773 (1931); Rosa afzeliana f. pilosior R.Keller in Syn. Ros. Eur. Med.: 672 (1931); Rosa afzeliana f. ploenensis R.Keller in Syn. Ros. Eur. Med.: 680 (1931); Rosa afzeliana var. praesanzensis R.Keller in Vierteljahrsschr. Naturf. Ges. Zürich 69(Beibl. 4): 48 (1924); Rosa afzeliana var. praetigoviensis R.Keller in Syn. Ros. Eur. Med.: 629 (1931); Rosa afzeliana f. prehensilis (Kupcsok) R.Keller in Bul. Grăd. Bot. Univ. Cluj 6: 37 (1926); Rosa afzeliana var. prostata Matsson in unknown publication; Rosa afzeliana f. proxima R.Keller in Syn. Ros. Eur. Med.: 633 (1931); Rosa afzeliana var. pseudoalpestris R.Keller in Verh. Naturf. Ges. Basel 35: 65 (1923); Rosa afzeliana var. pseudobovernieriana R.Keller in Verh. Naturf. Ges. Basel 35: 66 (1923); Rosa afzeliana var. pseudocenisia R.Keller in Syn. Ros. Eur. Med.: 678 (1931); Rosa afzeliana var. pseudofriderichsenii Herring in Dansk. Ros.: 44 (1934); Rosa afzeliana var. pseudolagenaria R.Keller in Syn. Ros. Eur. Med.: 592 (1931); Rosa afzeliana var. pseudoleventinensis R.Keller in Syn. Ros. Eur. Med.: 629 (1931); Rosa afzeliana var. pseudomontana R.Keller in Syn. Ros. Eur. Med.: 769 (1931); Rosa afzeliana f. pseudosquarrosa (Kupcsok) R.Keller in Bul. Grăd. Bot. Univ. Cluj 6: 40 (1926); Rosa afzeliana var. puberula R.Keller in Syn. Ros. Eur. Med.: 770 (1931); Rosa afzeliana var. pubescens R.Keller in Syn. Ros. Eur. Med.: 681 (1931); Rosa afzeliana var. pubescentifolia Lonacz. in V.L.Komarov (ed.), Fl. URSS 6: 220 (1954), nom. nud.; Rosa afzeliana var. pubescentissima Lonacz. in V.L.Komarov (ed.), Fl. URSS 6: 220 (1954), nom. nud.; Rosa afzeliana var. pulchella Herring in Dansk. Ros.: 38 (1934); Rosa afzeliana f. pycnophylla (Kupcsok) R.Keller in Bul. Grăd. Bot. Univ. Cluj 6: 35 (1926); Rosa afzeliana var. raronensis R.Keller in Syn. Ros. Eur. Med.: 628 (1931); Rosa afzeliana f. rectispina R.Keller in Syn. Ros. Eur. Med.: 674 (1931); Rosa afzeliana f. remota R.Keller in Syn. Ros. Eur. Med.: 627 (1931); Rosa afzeliana var. reuteri (Godet) Wolley-Dod in Revis. Brit. Roses: 104 (1931); Rosa afzeliana var. ripensis Herring in Dansk. Ros.: 42 (1934); Rosa afzeliana var. rossii R.Keller in Syn. Ros. Eur. Med.: 630 (1931); Rosa afzeliana f. rouyana R.Keller in Syn. Ros. Eur. Med.: 584 (1931); Rosa afzeliana var. rubroviolacea Herring in Dansk. Ros.: 32 (1934); Rosa afzeliana var. saepta Herring in Dansk. Ros.: 32 (1934); Rosa afzeliana f. salvanensis R.Keller in Syn. Ros. Eur. Med.: 626 (1931); Rosa afzeliana var. schioetzii Herring in Dansk. Ros.: 42 (1934); Rosa afzeliana var. schroeteri R.Keller in Verh. Naturf. Ges. Basel 35: 66 (1923); Rosa afzeliana var. selandica Herring in Dansk. Ros.: 43 (1934); Rosa afzeliana var. semipilosa Herring in Dansk. Ros.: 36 (1934); Rosa afzeliana var. setosoglandulosa Fr. ex R.Keller in Syn. Ros. Eur. Med.: 678 (1931); Rosa afzeliana var. slesvicensis Herring in Dansk. Ros.: 31 (1934); Rosa afzeliana var. solanifolia Matsson in Medelp. Fl.: 130 (1909), nom. nud.; Rosa afzeliana var. solanifolia Matsson ex Almq. in Ark. Bot. 11(11): 117 (1912); Rosa afzeliana var. solstitialoides Dingler in Beibl. Bot. Jahrb. Syst. 136: 20 (1926); Rosa afzeliana f. sphaeroidea R.Keller in Syn. Ros. Eur. Med.: 625 (1931); Rosa afzeliana f. stenophylla R.Keller in Syn. Ros. Eur. Med.: 770 (1931); Rosa afzeliana f. subcinerea R.Keller in Syn. Ros. Eur. Med.: 681 (1931); Rosa afzeliana var. subcomplicata R.Keller in Bul. Grăd. Bot. Univ. Cluj 6: 39 (1926); Rosa afzeliana f. subcomplicata (R.Keller) Wolley-Dod in Revis. Brit. Roses: 105 (1931); Rosa afzeliana f. subglandulosa R.Keller in Syn. Ros. Eur. Med.: 769 (1931); Rosa afzeliana f. subglaucescens R.Keller in Syn. Ros. Eur. Med.: 677 (1931); Rosa afzeliana f. subheteracantha R.Keller in Syn. Ros. Eur. Med.: 648 (1931); Rosa afzeliana var. subhispida R.Keller in Vierteljahrsschr. Naturf. Ges. Zürich 69(Beibl. 4): 49 (1924); Rosa afzeliana var. subhispida R.Keller in Syn. Ros. Eur. Med.: 632 (1931); Rosa afzeliana var. subpontismartini R.Keller in Syn. Ros. Eur. Med.: 704 (1931); Rosa afzeliana f. subseringei R.Keller in Vierteljahrsschr. Naturf. Ges. Zürich 69(Beibl. 4): 41 (1924); Rosa afzeliana var. suprapilosa R.Keller in Syn. Ros. Eur. Med.: 683 (1931); Rosa afzeliana var. tincensis R.Keller in Syn. Ros. Eur. Med.: 650 (1931); Rosa afzeliana var. trichophylla Herring in Dansk. Ros.: 42 (1934); Rosa afzeliana f. trichostyla R.Keller in Syn. Ros. Eur. Med.: 773 (1931); Rosa afzeliana var. typica R.Keller in Vierteljahrsschr. Naturf. Ges. Zürich 69(Beibl. 4): 41 (1924); Rosa afzeliana var. umbellata R.Keller in Vierteljahrsschr. Naturf. Ges. Zürich 69(Beibl. 4): 42 (1924); Rosa afzeliana f. uncinata R.Keller in Syn. Ros. Eur. Med.: 631 (1931); Rosa afzeliana subsp. uriensis (Lagger & Puget ex Christ) R.Keller & Gams in G.Hegi, Ill. Fl. Mitt.-Eur. 4: 1042 (1923); Rosa afzeliana var. vera R.Keller in Syn. Ros. Eur. Med.: 669 (1931); Rosa afzeliana var. viadra Holzfuss ex R.Keller in Syn. Ros. Eur. Med.: 772 (1931); Rosa afzeliana var. vix-hispida Herring in Dansk. Ros.: 34 (1934); Rosa afzeliana subsp. vosagiaca R.Keller & Gams in G.Hegi, Ill. Fl. Mitt.-Eur. 4: 1035 (1923), nom. superfl.; Rosa afzeliana var. wilczekii R.Keller in Syn. Ros. Eur. Med.: 682 (1931); Rosa afzeliana var. zajartakensis R.Keller in Bul. Grăd. Bot. Univ. Cluj 6: 39 (1926); Rosa afzeliana var. znaimensis R.Keller in Vierteljahrsschr. Naturf. Ges. Zürich 69(Beibl. 4): 50 (1924); Rosa bergiana var. lepidina Matsson in Acta Horti Berg. 4: 52 (1907); Rosa caesia var. adenophora (Gren.) Hesl.-Harr. in Naturalist (Hull) 1930: 165 (1930); Rosa caesia subsp. glauca (Desv.) G.G.Graham & A.L.Primavesi in Watsonia 18: 121 (1990); Rosa caesia var. reuteri (Godet) Hesl.-Harr. in Naturalist (Hull) 1930: 165 (1930); Rosa caesia subsp. vosagiaca D.H.Kent in List Vasc. Pl. Brit. Isles, Suppl.: 36 (1997), nom. superfl.; Rosa canina subsp. dumalis (Bechst.) Nyman in Consp. Fl. Eur.: 234 (1878); Rosa canina subsp. glauca (Desv.) Čelak. in Prodr. Fl. Böhmen: 898 (1881); Rosa canina proles dumalis (Bechst.) Samp. in Man. Fl. Port.: 330 (1912); Rosa canina f. dumalis (Bechst.) Christ in Rosen Schweiz: 158 (1873); Rosa canina var. dumalis (Bechst.) Dumort. in Bull. Soc. Roy. Bot. Belgique 6: 58 (1867); Rosa canina var. glauca Desv. in Bot. Agric. 2: 116 (1813); Rosa canina var. reuteri (Godet) Baker in J. Linn. Soc., Bot. 11: 233 (1869); Rosa canina var. virens Wahlenb. in Fl. Upsal.: 170 (1820); Rosa canina var. vosagiaca N.H.F.Desp. in Rosetum Gallicum: 88 (1828), nom. superfl.; Rosa communis var. dumalis (Bechst.) Rouy & E.G.Camus in G.Rouy & J.Foucaud, Fl. France 6: 293, 306 (1900); Rosa communis var. aciphylloides (Crép. ex Cottet & Castella) Rouy & E.G.Camus in G.Rouy & J.Foucaud, Fl. France 6: 320, 326 (1900); Rosa communis var. glauca (Desv.) Rouy & E.G.Camus in G.Rouy & J.Foucaud, Fl. France 6: 301 (1900); Rosa communis subsp. glauca Rouy & E.G.Camus in G.Rouy & J.Foucaud, Fl. France 6: 319 (1900); Rosa communis subsp. glauca (Desv.) Rouy & E.G.Camus in G.Rouy & J.Foucaud, Fl. France 6: 319 (1900); Rosa communis var. jurassica Rouy & E.G.Camus in G.Rouy & J.Foucaud, Fl. France 6: 320, 326 (1900); Rosa communis var. leioclada (Boullu) Rouy & E.G.Camus in G.Rouy & J.Foucaud, Fl. France 6: 293, 314 (1900); Rosa conferta Puget ex Cottet in Bull. Trav. Soc. Murith. 4: 28 (1875); Rosa coriifolia subsp. glauca (Desv.) Mansf. in unknown publication: 143 (1940); Rosa coriifolia uriensis (Lagger & Puget ex Christ) Crép. in Tabl. Anal. Roses Europ. 31(2): 84 (1892); Rosa coriifolia subsp. uriensis (Lagger & Puget ex Christ) R.Keller in H.Schinz & R.Keller, Fl. Schweiz, ed. 4, 1: 383 (1923); Rosa coriifolia subsp. vosagiaca R.Keller ex Dostál in Kvĕtena ČSR, ed. 2: 685 (1948), nom. superfl.; Rosa devenyensis Sabr. & Gáyer in Magyar Bot. Lapok 16: 60 (1917 publ. 1918); Rosa dumalis var. acharii (Billb.) Boulenger in Bull. Soc. Roy. Bot. Belgique 49: 114 (1927); Rosa dumalis f. acutifolia Braeucker in Deutschl. Wilde Rosen: 53 (1882); Rosa dumalis var. barclayana Boulenger in Bull. Jard. Bot. État Bruxelles 12: 71 (1931); Rosa dumalis f. barclayana (Boulenger) Popek in Biosyst. Rosa: 61 (1996); Rosa dumalis var. besseriana Popek in Biosyst. Rosa: 53 (1996); Rosa dumalis f. dentatistipulata Popek in Fragm. Florist. Geobot. 29: 346 (1983 publ. 1986); Rosa dumalis var. devenyensis (Sabr. & Gáyer) Ker.-Nagy in Tört. Magyarorsz. Rózsák Kismonográf.: 347 (2012); Rosa dumalis var. dissimilis Heinr.Braun in Pl. Cernagor. Lect.: 102 (1888); Rosa dumalis f. genuina Posp. in Fl. Oesterr. Küstenl. 2(1): 314 (1898), not validly publ.; Rosa dumalis f. genuina Posp. in Fl. Oesterr. Küstenl. 2(1): 314 (1898), not validly publ.; Rosa dumalis glandulosa Gren. in Fl. Jurass.: 245 (1865); Rosa dumalis f. latifolia Braeucker in Deutschl. Wilde Rosen: 52 (1882); Rosa dumalis var. legitima Gren. in Billotia 1: 121 (1869); Rosa dumalis var. leioclada Boullu in A.Cariot, Étude Fl., éd. 8, 2: 263 (1889); Rosa dumalis f. nervipilosa Popek in Fragm. Florist. Geobot. 29: 347 (1983 publ. 1986); Rosa dumalis f. platycarpa Vuk. in Rad Jugoslav. Akad. Znan. 69: 34 (1884); Rosa dumalis f. porciusii R.Keller & Prodan in Trandaf. 3(1): 442 (1932); Rosa dumalis var. pseudosphaeroidea R.Keller ex Prodan in Trandaf. 3(1): 443 (1932); Rosa dumalis f. rotundifolia Braeucker in Deutschl. Wilde Rosen: 54 (1882); Rosa dumalis var. salicifolia (Vuk.) Ker.-Nagy in Tört. Magyarorsz. Rózsák Kismonográf.: 347 (2012); Rosa dumalis var. stygmatotes Gand. in Tab. Rhodo. Eur.: s.n. (1881); Rosa dumalis var. suberiostyla Prodan in Bul. Grăd. Bot. Univ. Cluj 12: 146 (1932); Rosa dumalis f. suberiostyla (Prodan) Borza in Consp. Fl. Roman. 1: 147 (1947); Rosa dumalis f. subglabristyla Popek in Fragm. Florist. Geobot. 29: 347 (1983 publ. 1986); Rosa dumalis f. subhispida Braeucker in Deutschl. Wilde Rosen: 54 (1882); Rosa dumalis var. typica Posp. in Fl. Oesterr. Küstenl. 2(1): 314 (1898), not validly publ.; Rosa dumalis subsp. vosagiaca R.Keller in Syn. Ros. Eur. Med.: 578 (1931), nom. superfl.; Rosa elatophylla (Matsson ex Almq.) Matsson in Kongl. Svenska Vetensk. Acad. Handl., ser. 3, 14(3): 62 (1935); Rosa falcata var. ceretanica Sennen in Exsicc. (Pl. Espagne) 1917: n.° 3030 (1918), nom. nud.; Rosa glauca Vill. ex Loisel. in J. Bot. (Desvaux) 2: 336 (1809), nom. illeg.; Rosa glauca var. genuina (Gren.) Matsson in L.M.Neuman, Sver. Fl.: 357 (1901), not validly publ.; Rosa glauca var. glandulosa (Crép.) Cadevall in Fl. Catalunya 2: 300 (1919); Rosa glauca var. pseudomarsica Burnat & Gremli in Roses Alp. Mar., Suppl.: 41 (1882); Rosa glauca subsp. pseudomarsica (Burnat & Gremli) Arcang. in Comp. Fl. Ital.: 551 (1894); Rosa glauca var. reuteri (Godet) Nyman in Consp. Fl. Eur., Suppl. 2: 116 (1889); Rosa glauca f. reuteri (Godet) Cottet in Guide Bot. Cant. Fribourg: 107 (1891); Rosa glauca subsp. reuteri (Godet) Hayek in Fl. Steiermark 1: 938 (1909); Rosa glauca var. rigidula (Puget ex Cottet) Crép. in A.Fiori & al., Fl. Anal. Italia 1: 590 (1898); Rosa glauca f. salicifolia Vuk. in Oesterr. Bot. Z. 37: 303 (1887); Rosa glauca subvar. salicifolia (Vuk.) R.Keller in P.F.A.Ascherson & K.O.R.Graebner, Syn. Mitteleur. Fl. 6(1): 196 (1901); Rosa glauca var. typica (Christ) H.Waldner in Eur. Rosentyp.: 30 (1885), not validly publ.; Rosa glauca uriensis (Lagger & Puget ex Christ) Crép. in Tabl. Anal. Roses Europ. 31(2): 85 (1892); Rosa glauca var. vallium Sennen in Exsicc. (Pl. Espagne) 1922: n.° 4394 (1923), nom. illeg.; Rosa kionae Heinr.Braun & Halácsy in Verh. K. K. Zool.-Bot. Ges. Wien 38: 752 (1888); Rosa lepidina (Matsson) Matsson in Kongl. Svenska Vetensk. Acad. Handl., ser. 3, 14(3): 254 (1935); Rosa lepidina subsp. stenobasis Brenner in Meddeland. Soc. Fauna Fl. Fenn. 50: 67 (1925); Rosa lutetiana var. dumalis (Bechst.) Wolley-Dod in J. Bot. 58(Suppl.): 8 (1920); Rosa monticola var. reuteri (Godet) Rapin in Guide Bot. Vaud: 194 (1862); Rosa morthieri (Godet) Gand. in Bull. Trav. Soc. Murith. 5: 28 (1876); Rosa obovata Lagger & Puget ex Cottet in Bull. Trav. Soc. Murith. 4: 23 (1875), nom. nud.; Rosa reuteri (Godet) Reut. in Cat. Pl. Vasc. Genève, éd. 2: 68 (1861); Rosa reuteri adenophora Gren. in Fl. Jurass. 1: 239 (1865); Rosa reuteri var. biserrata Reut. in Cat. Pl. Vasc. Genève, éd. 2: 68 (1861); Rosa reuteri var. genuina Gren. in Fl. Jurass. 1: 239 (1865), not validly publ.; Rosa reuteri var. glandulosa Crép. in M.Willkomm & J.M.C.Lange, Prodr. Fl. Hispan. 3: 213 (1874); Rosa reuteri f. hispidior Christ in Flora 58: 295 (1875); Rosa reuteri f. morthieri Godet in Fl. Jura, Suppl.: 75 (1869); Rosa reuteri f. typica Christ in Rosen Schweiz: 165 (1873), not validly publ.; Rosa rigidula Puget ex Cottet in Bull. Trav. Soc. Murith. 4: 23 (1875); Rosa rubrifolia var. glauca (Desv.) Dumort. in Fl. Belg.: 94 (1827); Rosa rubrifolia var. reuteri Godet in Fl. Jura: 208 (1852); Rosa solstitialis var. denudata Gren. in Fl. Jurass. 1: 238 (1865); Rosa subafzeliana Chrshan. in V.L.Komarov (ed.), Fl. URSS 6: 583 (1954); Rosa subafzeliana var. curvata Chrshan. in V.L.Komarov (ed.), Fl. URSS 6: 584 (1954); Rosa uriensis (Lagger & Puget ex Christ) Schinz & R.Keller in Fl. Schweiz: 262 (1900); Rosa uriensis Lagger & Puget ex Cottet in Bull. Trav. Soc. Murith. 4: 28 (1875), nom. nud.; Rosa uriensis var. addensis Cornaz ex R.Keller in P.F.A.Ascherson & K.O.R.Graebner, Syn. Mitteleur. Fl. 6(1): 240 (1901); Rosa uriensis var. adenophora R.Keller in P.F.A.Ascherson & K.O.R.Graebner, Syn. Mitteleur. Fl. 6(1): 236 (1901); Rosa uriensis var. biserrata R.Keller in P.F.A.Ascherson & K.O.R.Graebner, Syn. Mitteleur. Fl. 6(1): 236 (1901); Rosa uriensis var. brueggeri Christ ex R.Keller in P.F.A.Ascherson & K.O.R.Graebner, Syn. Mitteleur. Fl. 6(1): 240 (1901); Rosa uriensis f. burmiensis R.Keller in Beih. Bot. Centralbl. 33(2): 55 (1915); Rosa uriensis subvar. elliptica R.Keller in P.F.A.Ascherson & K.O.R.Graebner, Syn. Mitteleur. Fl. 6(1): 237 (1901); Rosa uriensis var. glabriuscula R.Keller in P.F.A.Ascherson & K.O.R.Graebner, Syn. Mitteleur. Fl. 6(1): 235 (1901); Rosa uriensis var. glandulifera R.Keller in P.F.A.Ascherson & K.O.R.Graebner, Syn. Mitteleur. Fl. 6(1): 239 (1901); Rosa uriensis var. gracilis R.Keller in P.F.A.Ascherson & K.O.R.Graebner, Syn. Mitteleur. Fl. 6(1): 239 (1901); Rosa uriensis var. grandifrons R.Keller in P.F.A.Ascherson & K.O.R.Graebner, Syn. Mitteleur. Fl. 6(1): 238 (1901); Rosa uriensis var. heteracantha R.Keller in P.F.A.Ascherson & K.O.R.Graebner, Syn. Mitteleur. Fl. 6(1): 240 (1901); Rosa uriensis var. hispidissima R.Keller in P.F.A.Ascherson & K.O.R.Graebner, Syn. Mitteleur. Fl. 6(1): 236 (1901); Rosa uriensis var. inermis R.Keller in P.F.A.Ascherson & K.O.R.Graebner, Syn. Mitteleur. Fl. 6(1): 236 (1901); Rosa uriensis var. longipedunculata R.Keller in P.F.A.Ascherson & K.O.R.Graebner, Syn. Mitteleur. Fl. 6(1): 239 (1901); Rosa uriensis var. pubescens R.Keller in P.F.A.Ascherson & K.O.R.Graebner, Syn. Mitteleur. Fl. 6(1): 237 (1901); Rosa uriensis var. rigidula (Puget ex Cottet) R.Keller in P.F.A.Ascherson & K.O.R.Graebner, Syn. Mitteleur. Fl. 6(1): 238 (1901); Rosa uriensis var. rufescens R.Keller in P.F.A.Ascherson & K.O.R.Graebner, Syn. Mitteleur. Fl. 6(1): 239 (1901); Rosa uriensis var. simplicidens R.Keller in P.F.A.Ascherson & K.O.R.Graebner, Syn. Mitteleur. Fl. 6(1): 236 (1901); Rosa uriensis var. typica R.Keller in P.F.A.Ascherson & K.O.R.Graebner, Syn. Mitteleur. Fl. 6(1): 238 (1901); Rosa uriensis subvar. uniserrata R.Keller in P.F.A.Ascherson & K.O.R.Graebner, Syn. Mitteleur. Fl. 6(1): 237 (1901); Rosa uriensis var. uniserrata R.Keller in Beih. Bot. Centralbl. 33(2): 55 (1915); Rosa vosagiaca Déségl. in J. Bot. 12: 75 (1874), nom. superfl.; Rosa vosagiaca var. bargensis R.Keller in Mitt. Naturf. Ges. Schaffhausen 4: 69 (1925); Rosa vosagiaca var. decipiens R.Keller in Ber. Thätigk. St. Gallischen Naturwiss. Ges. 1895-1896: 222 (1897); Rosa vosagiaca var. inermis R.Keller in Vierteljahrsschr. Naturf. Ges. Zürich 62: 671 (1917); Rosa vosagiaca var. montanifolia Christ in Ber. Schweiz. Bot. Ges. 35: 97 (1926), nom. nud.; Rosa vosagiaca f. pusilla Christ in Ber. Schweiz. Bot. Ges. 35: 97 (1926), nom. nud.; Rosa vosagiaca f. semipusilla Christ in Ber. Schweiz. Bot. Ges. 35: 97 (1926), nom. nud.; Rosa vosagiaca var. subhispida R.Keller in Vierteljahrsschr. Naturf. Ges. Zürich 62: 672 (1917); Rosa vosagiaca var. typica (Christ) R.Keller in H.Schinz & R.Keller, Fl. Schweiz, ed. 3, 2: 201 (1914), not validly publ.

= Rosa dumalis =

Species of flowering plant

Rosa dumalis, the glaucous dog rose, is a species of rose in the Rosaceae family. The native range of this rose stretches from Europe to the Caucasus and also down to northwestern Africa.

== Description ==
It has a deciduous scrambling shrub form in the wild and spreads by suckers.

It is a shrub that grows 1–2 m (3 ft 3 in – 6 ft 7 in) high. It has long, bent thorns. It bears fragrant, dark or light pink flowers in June and July. The autumn produced hips are oval, quite soft, and rich in ascorbic acid (vitamin C). There are an average of 15.5 seeds per fruit. Fruits average 66.2% water, and their dry weight includes 14.4% carbohydrates and 0.5% lipids.

== Taxonomy ==
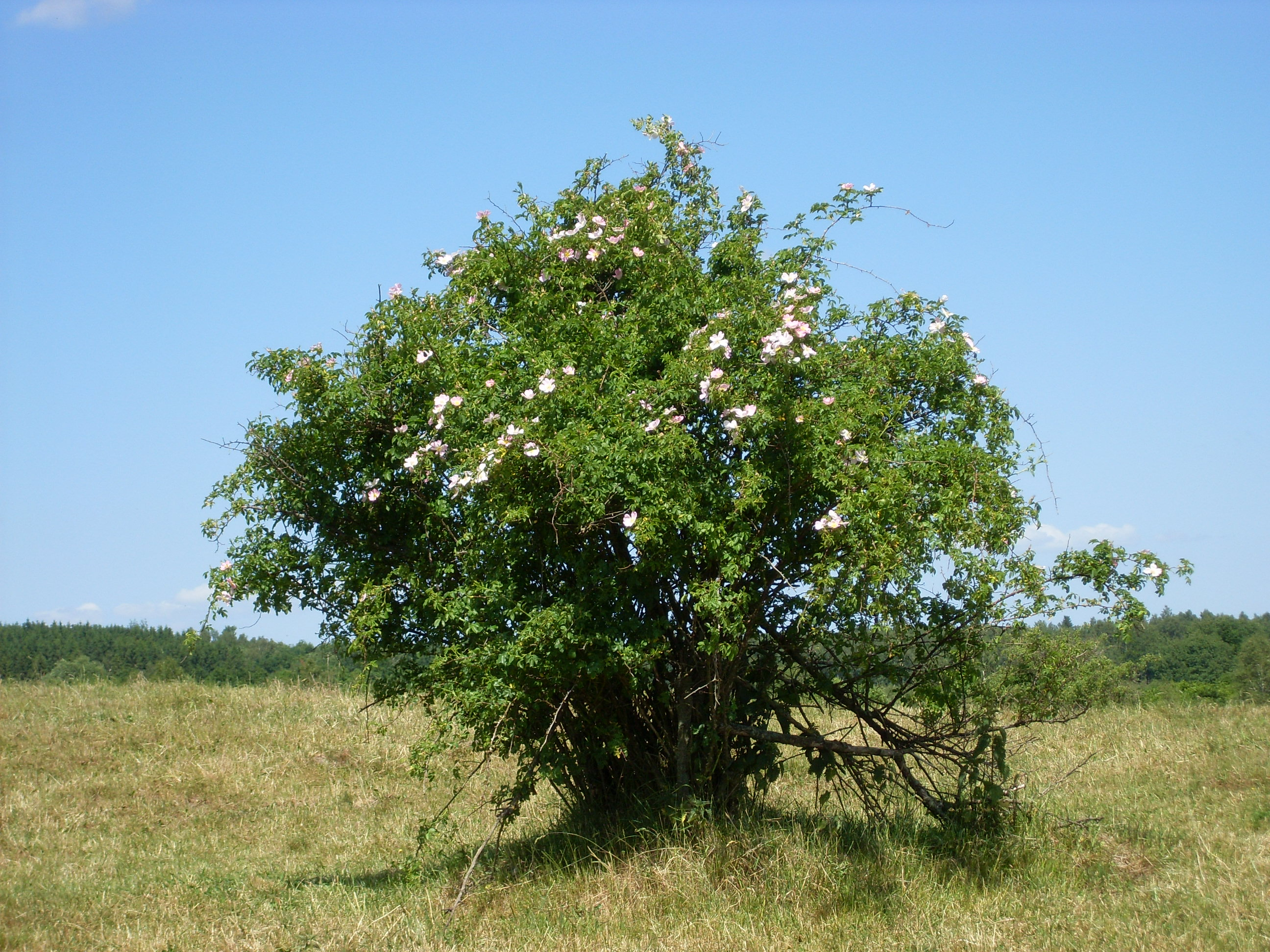
Rosa dumalis near Lund, Scania County, Sweden

Not all authorities accept it as distinct, with the Flora Europaea (encyclopedia of plants, published up to 1994) treating it as a synonym of Rosa canina or R. squarrosa. On the other hand, Plants of the World Online treats Rosa vosagiaca (accepted by Flora Europaea) as a synonym of Rosa dumalis.

It is an accepted name and verified by United States Department of Agriculture and the Agricultural Research Service on 2 January 2015, and by World Flora Online.

It was first described and published by German botanist Johann Matthäus Bechstein in Forstbotanik (published in Henning, Erfurt), vol.241 on page 969 in 1810. The specific epithet of dumalis is derived from the Latin word dumosus meaning thorny, compact and bushy.

It has the common name of Glaucous dog rose.

Microsatellite markers (simple sequence repeats (SSRs)) have been used by plant geneticists to determine relationships within the Rosa family. It has been found that there was a high degree of similarity between Rosa brunonii and R. dumalis, which was supported by both molecular and morphological data.

== Distribution ==
It is native to several countries; (in Europe) Albania, Austria, Bosnia and Herzegovina, Bulgaria, Czech Republic, Denmark, Estonia, Finland, France, Germany, Great Britain, Greece, Hungary, Iceland, Ireland, Italy, Latvia, Lithuania, Moldova, Montenegro, Netherlands, North Macedonia, Norway, Poland, Portugal, Romania, Serbia, Spain, Slovakia, Slovenia, Sweden, Switzerland, Tunisia, Turkey, Ukraine and Yugoslavia. Parts of Russia (Belarus, European Russia and the North Caucasus area), as well as (in Africa), Algeria and Morocco.

== Uses ==
The rose hips of Rosa canina and Rosa dumalis have been collected and traditionally used in Turkey for several decades. They are mainly collected during winter months and then they can be processed into several products such as marmalade, syrup, jam, as well as healthy teas and jellies. They also have been known as medicinal plants and used in folk medicine for quite a while. The rose hips were used to treat coughs, stomach aches and sore throats.

In Turkey, due to its thorns and scrambling habit, it is often used as a fence (or hedge) in open areas, especially on the edges of arable fields.

== Bibliography ==
- Ehrlén, Johan; Eriksson, Ove (1991). "Phenological variation in fruit characteristics in vertebrate-dispersed plants". Oecologia. 86 (4): 463–470. doi:10.1007/BF00318311. ISSN 0029-8549.

== Other sources ==
- Flora Europaea: Rosa dumalis
