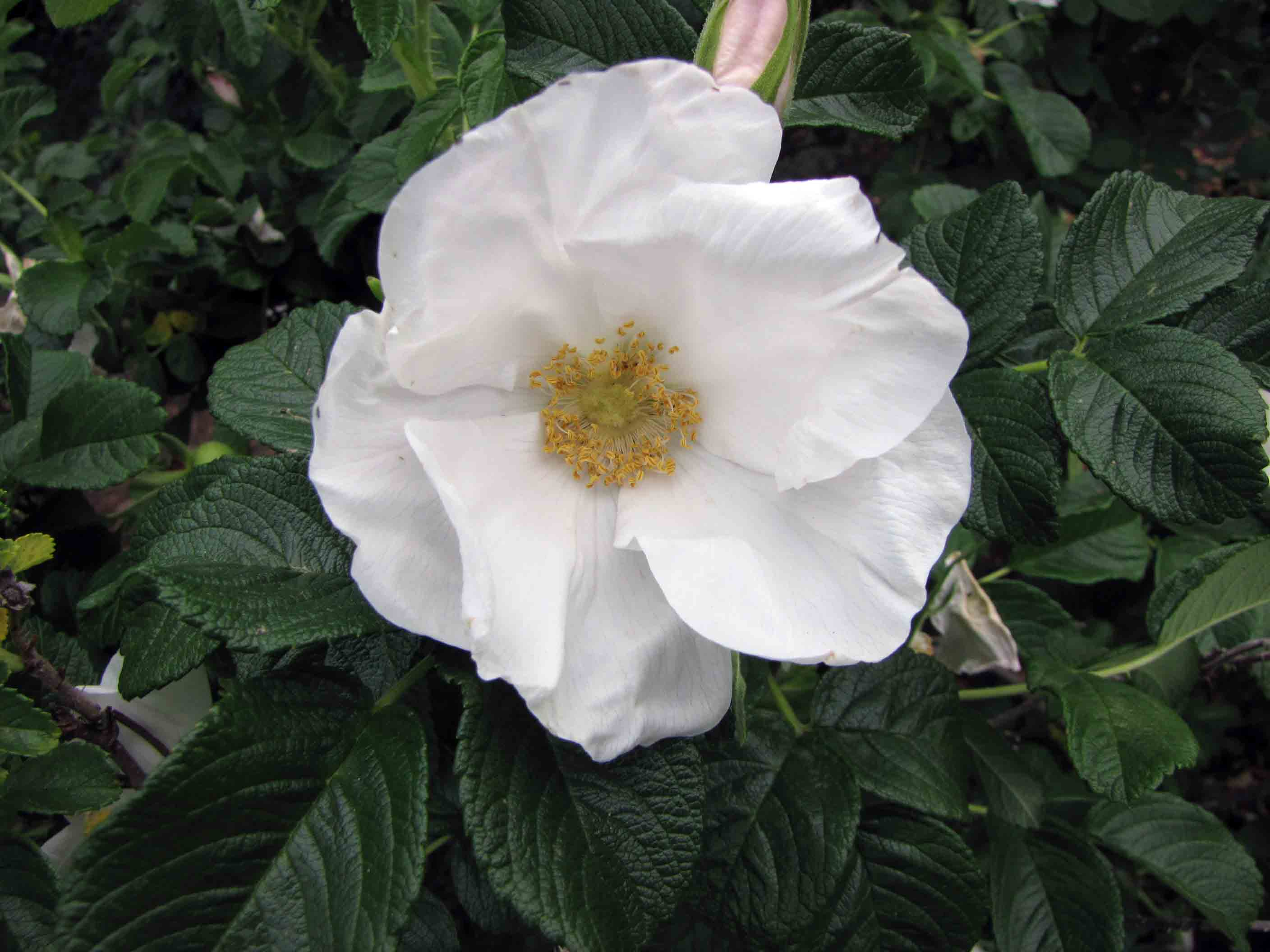
- Flower

Scientific classification
- Kingdom: Plantae
- Clade: Embryophytes
- Clade: Tracheophytes
- Clade: Spermatophytes
- Clade: Angiosperms
- Clade: Eudicots
- Clade: Rosids
- Order: Rosales
- Family: Rosaceae
- Genus: Rosa
- Species: R. brunonii

Binomial name
- Rosa brunonii Lindl.

Synonyms
- Rosa clavigera H.Lév.; Rosa nepalensis Lindl. ex Steud.; Rosa pubescens Roxb.

= Rosa brunonii =

Species of flowering plant

Rosa brunonii is a species of flowering plant in the family Rosaceae. It is commonly known as the Himalayan musk rose. It is a deciduous or semi-evergreen climber that typically grows at altitudes of 1,200–2,400 meters (3,900–7,900 ft).

The five-petalled flowers are white and about 3–4 cm (1.2–1.6 in) across, filled with a mass of yellow stamens. The stems are prickly and the leaves are finely-toothed ovals with pointed tips. Rosa moschata found in the western Himalayas is very similar, the main difference being that its branches are smooth and the leaf stalks are without prickles. Several other varieties of wild white roses grow in the hills. Wild, pink roses or Rosa macrophylla are also common and can be seen growing side by side with the white ones. When the wild rose withers away, its place is taken by a red rounded fruit known as a rose-hip.

In Hindi, the musk rose is known as Kuji, Kunja or Karer. Sometimes the wood is used to make walking sticks. An attar is extracted from the flowers. A soothing cough syrup is made out of the hips; these have a high vitamin C content. A kind of a marmalade can also be made of the hips by boiling them and passing the pulp through a sieve.
