= Rosa 'Great Maiden's Blush' =

Light pink Alba rose cultivar

'Great Maiden's Blush'
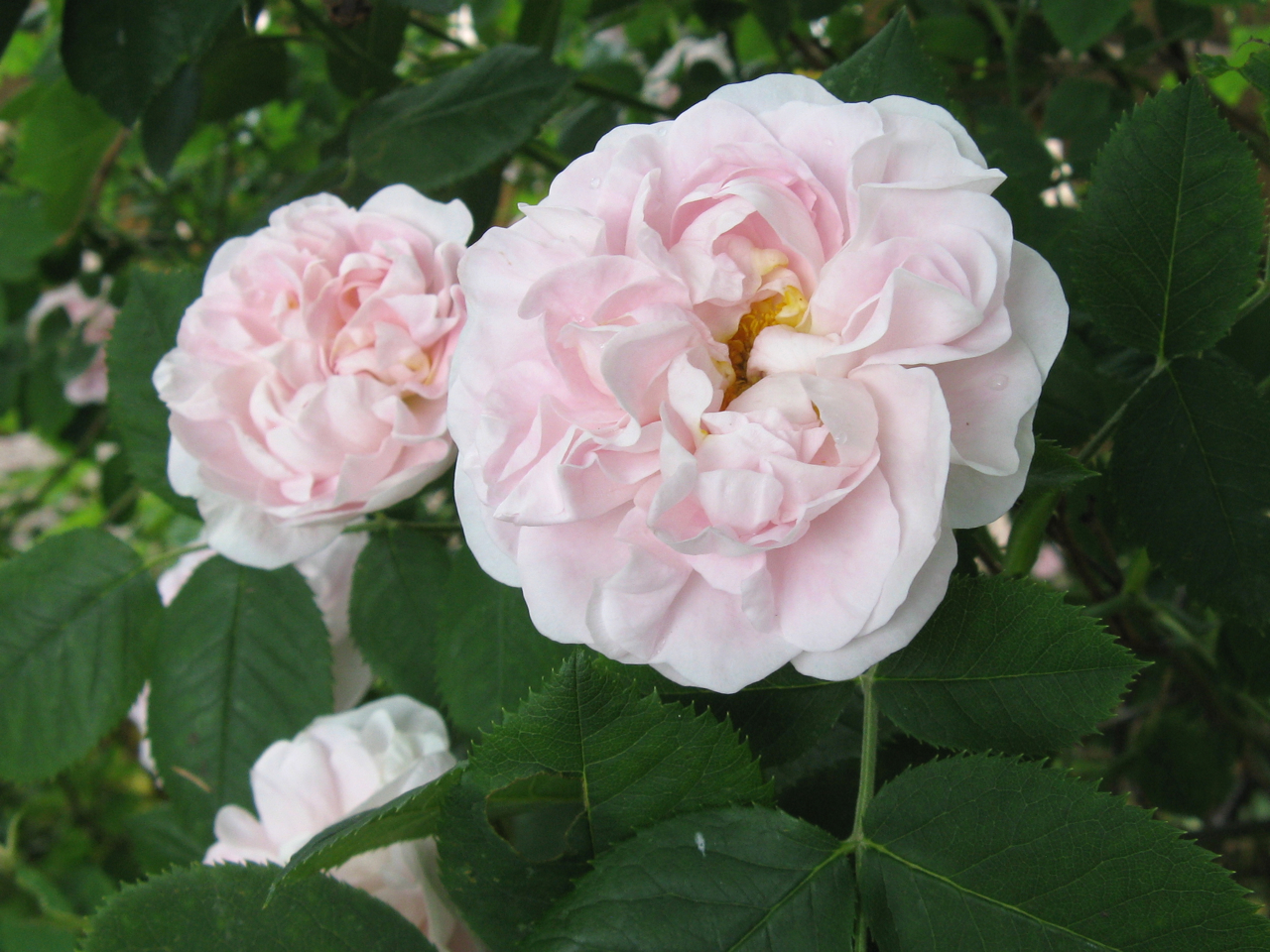
- 'Great Maiden's Blush'
- Genus: Rosa
- Species: Rosa × alba
- Cultivar: 'Great Maiden's Blush'
- Marketing names: 'Cuisse de Nymphe' (before 1400), Alba Maiden's Blush
- Origin: 14th century France or England

Rosa 'Great Maiden's Blush' is white blend Alba rose cultivar that appeared during the 14th century. It was introduced in Australia by Camden Park in 1843 as 'Maiden's Blush'. 'Great Maiden's Blush' has received the Royal Horticultural Society's Award of Garden Merit, and the American Rose Society's Dowager Queen award at the Syracuse Rose Society show.

== Description ==
'Great Maiden's Blush' is a tall, slender Alba rose, 5 to 8 ft (1.5–2.4 m) in height, with a 3 to 4 ft (0.91–1.22 m) spread. It has medium, very full (41+ petals), borne mostly solitary, or in small clusters of up to five, and has a globular, deeply cupped bloom form. Bloom size is 3 to 5 in (76 to 127 mm). The rose has a strong fragrance. The young buds tend to have a creamy yellow color on the outside. The flower petals are creamy-white or white in the bud, then pale pink, and finally fade again to white. It is not overly pricky, has relatively few thorns. It tolerates shade and it can be grown on or beside north-facing walls (in the northern hemisphere). It has enough strength and vigour that it can be used as a climber.

Like other Rosa × alba cultivars, it is very winter hardy, a tall shrub with arching branches. It blooms in spring only. This cultivar is known by many other names, including 'Cuisse de Nymphe', 'Incarnata', 'Maiden's Blush' and 'Loyalist'.

== History ==
Garden Historians disagree on the origin of 'Great Maiden's Blush'. It is either 'Cuisse de Nymphe', originating in France in the 14th century or 'Great Maiden's Blush' from Kew in England. It is one of the earliest Alba roses and considered to be a very beautiful rose.

== Awards ==
'Great Maiden's Blush' has received the Royal Horticultural Society's Award of Garden Merit, and the American Rose Society's Dowager Queen award at the Syracuse Rose Society show.
