= Olga Fedchenko =

Russian botanist, explorer and artist

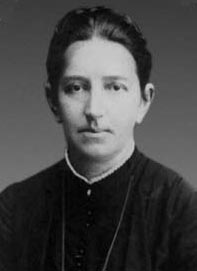
- Born: Ol'ga Aleksandrovna Armfeld; 30 October 1845; Moscow, Moskovsky Uyezd, Moscow Governorate, Russian Empire
- Died: 24 April 1921 (aged 75); Petrograd, Russian SFSR
- Other name: Olga Fedtschenko
- Education: University of Moscow
- Spouse: Alexei Pavlovich Fedchenko
- Children: 1
- Scientific career
- Fields: Botany
- Author abbrev. (botany): O.Fedtsch.

Olga Aleksandrovna Fedchenko or Fedtschenko (Russian: Ольга Александровна Федченко; née Armfeld; 30 October 1845 – 24 April 1921) was a Russian botanist. Rosa fedtschenkoana, which is found in Asia, was named in her honour (with a German transliteration of her name).

== Early life ==
Ol'ga (Olga) Armfeld was born in Moscow in 1845. Her father was Alexandre Armfeldt who was a professor at the University of Moscow. She was educated at home until she was eleven when she went to school where she showed an interest in Botany. She began collecting plants and from about 1861 she was using her art and language skills to translate academic descriptions from English, French and German naturalists. She was preparing illustrations, communicating with foreign naturalists and visiting the University's Zoological Museum. She worked for several years before she met the geologist, Alexei Pavlovich Fedchenko.

== Marriage and Turkestan ==
She married the recently qualified Moscow University geology graduate Fedchenko on 2 July 1867. She and her husband worked together and when in 1868 he was recommended to undertake a hazardous mission to the recently conquered region of Russian Turkestan. She became a full, but unpaid, member of the team.

The mission was hazardous because Turkestan was still transitioning to becoming part of the Russian Empire. Her husband's name had been recommended to the first Governor-General of Turkestan, Konstantin von Kaufman. Kaufman was a military governor and he was still extending the borders of the Russian Empire. Kaufman wanted an investigation of what he saw as a "newly and scarcely explored region". Kaufman's team included the Fedchenkos, the war artist Vasily Vereshchagin and later the educationalist and linguist Nikolai Ostroumov. Kaufman set up a Tashkent outpost of the Moscow Society of Natural Scientists (OLEAE). The Fedchenkos did not set out immediately for Turkestan but they went on preparatory visits to Italy, France and Sweden to study their collections. Olga also went on solo trips to Russian Museums. During all this travelling she used the opportunity to make notes and gather exhibits.

Together they went on botanical expeditions to the Caucasus, Crimea, Kyrgyzstan, southern Urals, West Tien Shan and the Pamir ranges. The Fenchenkos made three separate explorations between 1868 and 1872. These investigations were central to the Governor-General's policy as he wanted to see this information shared. The local newspaper was used to publish the scientific findings and Kaufman was targeting the 1872 Moscow All-Russian Technical Exhibition as an opportunity to display Turkestan research and artefacts.

In 1872 she gave birth to Boris Fedtschenko. Alexei died in 1873, aged 29, in a climbing accident on Mont Blanc, where he had gone to compare the glaciers with those he had seen in Turkestan. Olga buried her husband at Chamonix and returned to Moscow.

== Widow and naturalist ==
The OLEAE, who had sent the two of them, now asked Olga to continue the task of publishing their findings. This was a large task as Olga had gathered over 1,500 specimens.. She catalogued their collections and then set out on further investigations alone.

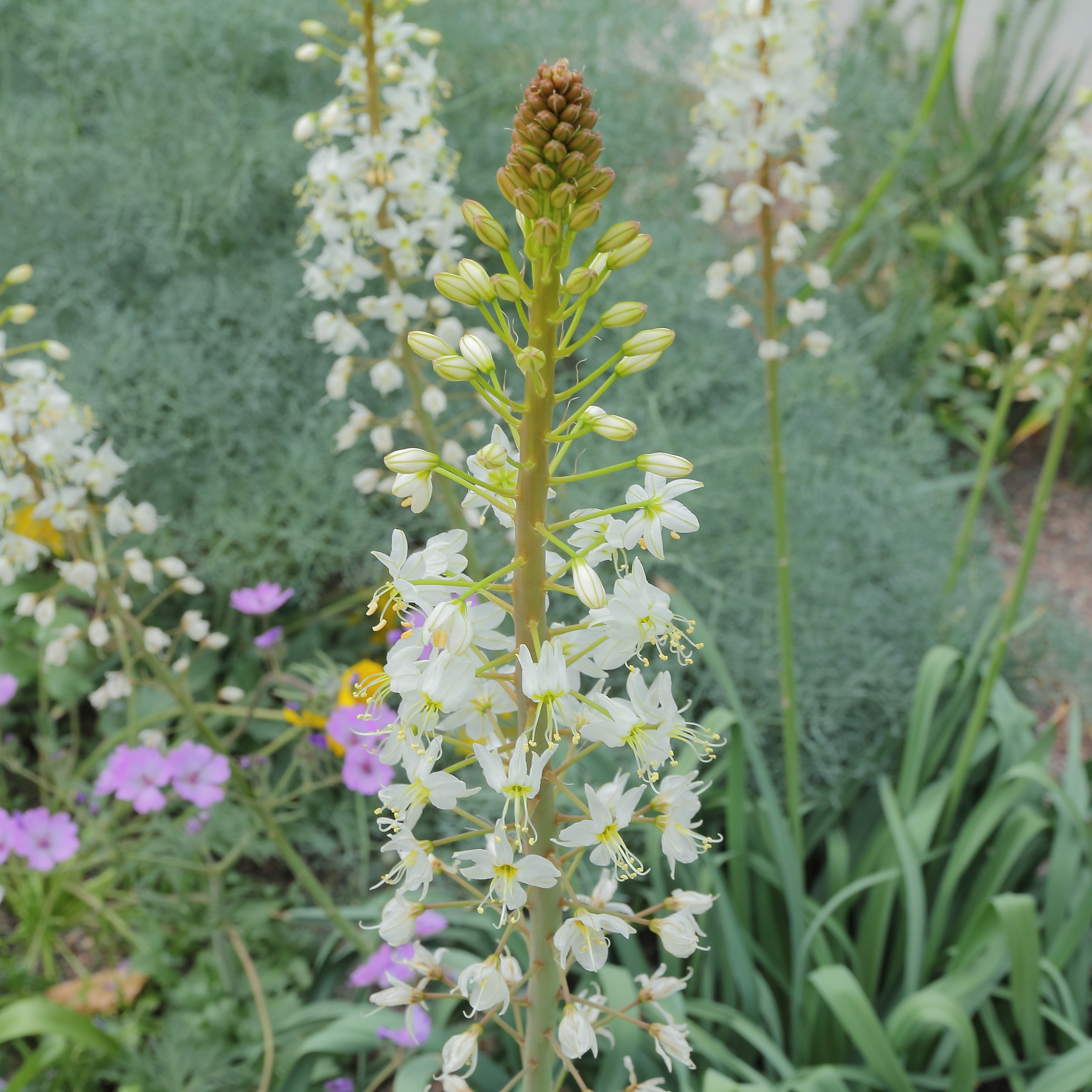
Eremurus lactiflorus is one of the species she first described

In 1878, Eduard August von Regel named and published Rosa fedtschenkoana after her. Her son Boris also took an interest in botany. In the Memoirs of the Kazan Society of Naturalists Vol.32 and 33, Olga and Boris described 43 endemic species in the buttercup family Ranunculaceae found in Russian Turkestan.

In 1901, Olga and Boris visited the Pamir ranges together. On their return they jointly published Flora of the Pamirs in 1901. Later in 1913 they again published Conspectus Florae Turkestanicae together. Olga contributed to Gardeners' Chronicle on 10 June 1905, giving a short description of Eremurus turkestanicus. She also published several works in 'Trudy Imp. S.-Peterburgsk. Bot. Sada' (Proceedings of the Petersburg Botanical Garden); including for Draba korshinskyi in 1914.

She described three Juno irises, Iris baldshuanica (in Russk. Bot. Zhurn. 5: 77. 1909,), Iris degerensis (now classed as a synonym of Iris narbutii) and Iris narynensis (in Bulletin of the Jardin of St Peterburg's Botanic Garden 159 in 1905,). In 1906, she became the second female corresponding member of the Russian Academy of Sciences.

She named one species of plant, Fritillaria seravschanica but she never published it (to validate the name). Later, another Russian botanist Alexei Vvedensky, a monocot specialist, appears to have changed Olga’s temporary epithet to Fritillaria olgae and formally described it in her son Boris Fedtschenko's book, Flora Turkmenistan.

== Death ==
She died on 24 April 1921, aged 75, in Petrograd (now Saint Petersburg).

== Legacy ==
In 1922, Modest Mikhaĭlovich Iljin (a botanist from the Botanical Garden of the Academy of Sciences of Soviet Russia) named a genus of Asteraceae (from Central Asia) in her honour Olgaea.

The standard author abbreviation O.Fedtsch. is used to indicate this person as the author when citing a botanical name.

== Other sources ==
- Russkii Botanicheskii Zhurnal, 57(3), pages 413–416
- Brummitt, R.K. & Powell, C.E., Authors Pl. Names (1992), page 196
- Lanjouw, J. & Stafleu, F.A., Index Herb. Coll. E-H (1957), page 192
