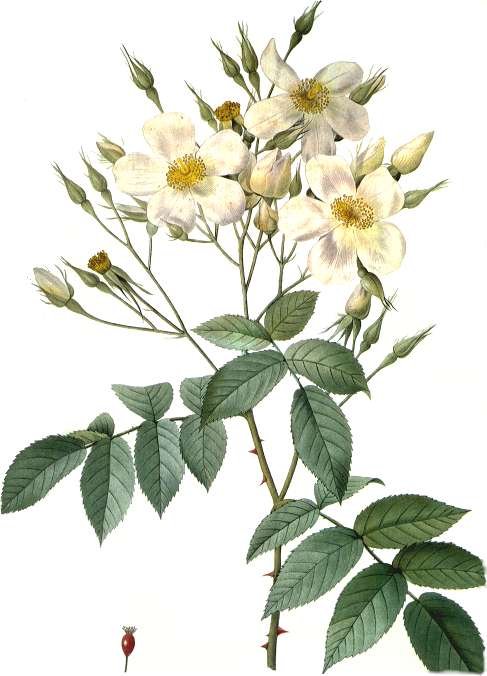

Scientific classification
- Kingdom: Plantae
- Clade: Tracheophytes
- Clade: Angiosperms
- Clade: Eudicots
- Clade: Rosids
- Order: Rosales
- Family: Rosaceae
- Genus: Rosa
- Species: R. moschata

Binomial name
- Rosa moschata Herrm.

Synonyms
- Rosa sempervirens var. moschata (Herrm.) Gren.; Rosa arborea Olivier ex Bosc; Rosa broteroi Tratt.; Rosa brownii Tratt.; Rosa brunonii var. arborea (Pers.) Ser.; Rosa brunonii var. nudiuscula (Lindl.) Ser.; Rosa dupontii Déségl.; Rosa glandulifera Roxb.; Rosa manuelii Losa; Rosa nepalensis Andrews; Rosa opsostemma Ehrh.; Rosa opsostemma plena Ehrh.; Rosa pissardii Carrière; Rosa recurva Roxb. ex Lindl.; Rosa ruscinonensis Gren. & Déségl.; Rosa timisorensis (Prodan) Prodan

= Rosa moschata =

Musk rose

Species of flowering plant

Rosa moschata, the musk rose, is a species of rose which has been long in cultivation. Its wild origins are in southern Iran to Afghanistan.

== Description ==
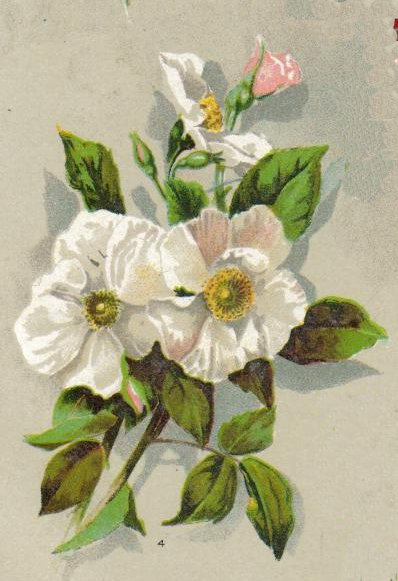
1902 painting

Rosa moschata is a shrub growing to 3 metres (10 ft). The prickles on the stems are straight or slightly curved and have a broad base. The light- or greyish-green leaves have 5 to 7 ovate leaflets with small teeth; the veins are sometimes pubescent and the rachis bears prickles. The stipules are narrow with spreading, free tips. Small, ovate fruits called hips are borne, turning orange-red in autumn.

The single white flowers are 5 centimetres (2 in) wide and grouped in a loose cyme or corymb, blooming on new growth from late spring until late autumn in warm climates, or from late summer onwards in cool-summer climates. The sepals are 2 cm long with slender points. The flowers have a characteristic musky scent emanating from the stamens, which is also found in some of its descendants.

=== Similar species ===
This species has historically been confused with R. brunonii, a closely related, tall-climbing species from the Himalayas that bears flowers in late spring and which possesses a similar, musky scent. They can be distinguished in gardens by their season of flowering and by their differing growth habits.

== Subdivision ==
The variety plena bears semi-double flowers, and a form with study name "Temple Musk", found in the United States, bears more fully double flowers.

== Cultivation ==
It has been contended that no truly wild examples of the musk rose have been found, though it is recorded in cultivation at least as far back as the 16th century (being mentioned in A Midsummer Night's Dream [1596]). It is important in cultivation as a parent to several groups of cultivated roses, notably the damask rose and the noisette group, and is valued for its scent and for its unusually long season of bloom among rose species.

== Uses ==
The seeds are processed into popular rose hip seed oil.
