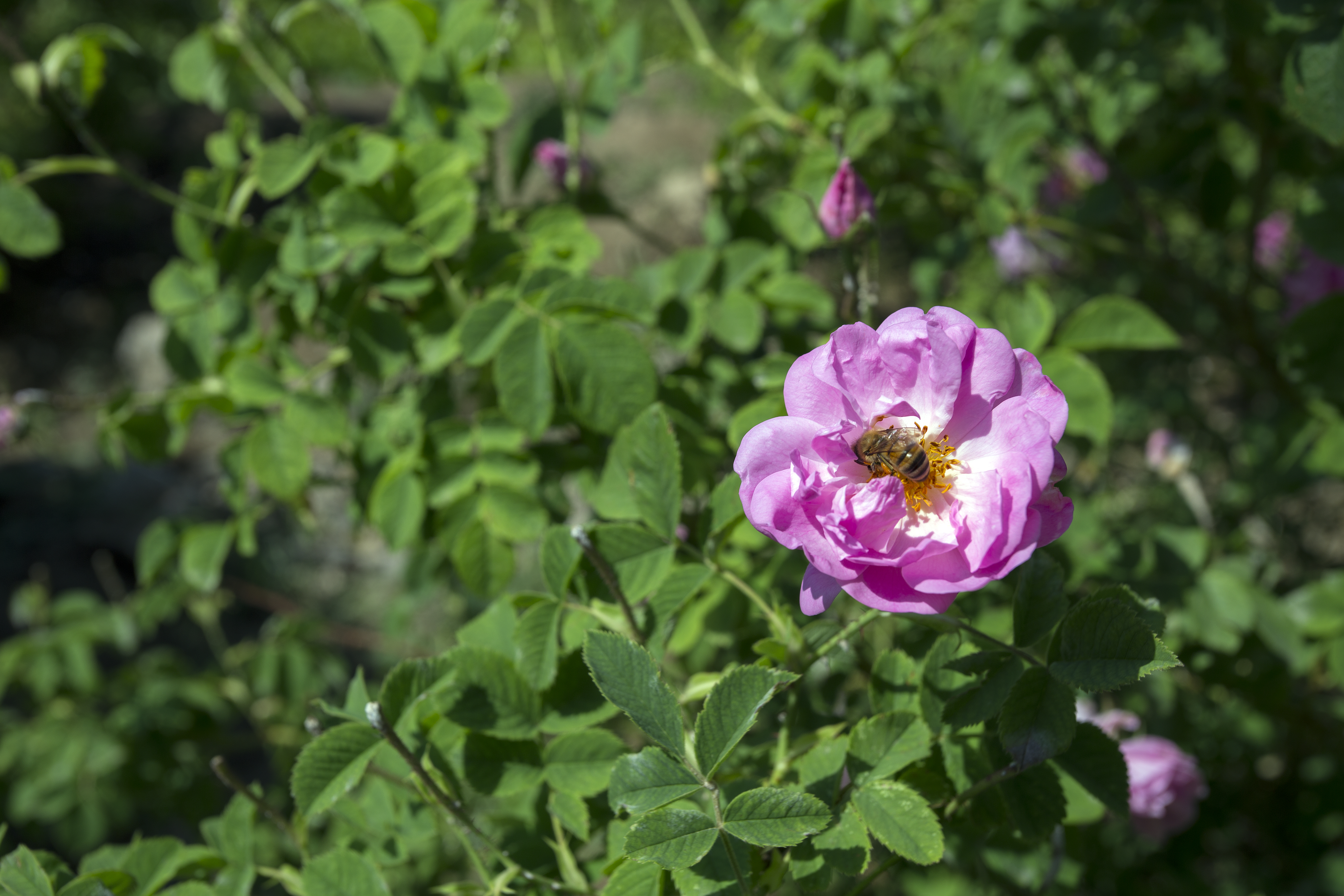

Scientific classification
- Kingdom: Plantae
- Clade: Tracheophytes
- Clade: Angiosperms
- Clade: Eudicots
- Clade: Rosids
- Order: Rosales
- Family: Rosaceae
- Genus: Rosa
- Species: R. × damascena

Binomial name
- Rosa × damascena Mill.

= Rosa × damascena =

Rose hybrid

Rosa × damascena (Latin for damascene rose), more commonly known as the Damask rose, or sometimes as the Iranian Rose, Bulgarian rose, Taif rose, Emirati rose, Ispahan rose, Isparta rose, and Castile rose, is a rose hybrid derived from Rosa gallica and Rosa moschata. DNA analysis has shown that a third species, Rosa fedtschenkoana, made some genetic contributions to the Damask rose.

The flowers are renowned for their fine fragrance and are commercially harvested for rose oil (either "rose otto" or "rose absolute") used in perfumery and to make rose water and "rose concrete". The flower petals are also edible. They are used to flavor food, as a garnish, as herbal tea, and preserved in sugar as gulkand. The Damask rose is the national flower of Iran.

In 2019, the Damask rose was added to the UNESCO Intangible Cultural Heritage Lists as an element of Syrian cultural heritage.

== Description ==
The Damask rose is a deciduous shrub growing to 2.2 metres (7 ft 3 in) tall, the stems densely armed with stout, curved prickles and stiff bristles. The leaves are pinnate, with five (rarely seven) leaflets. The roses are a light to moderate pink to light red. The relatively small flowers grow in groups. The bush has an informal shape. It is considered an important type of Old Rose, and also important for its prominent place in the pedigree of many other types.

=== Varieties ===
The hybrid is divided in two varieties:

- Summer Damasks (R. × damascena nothovar. damascena) have a short flowering season, only in the summer.

The hybrid Rosa × centifolia is derived in part from Rosa × damascena, as are Bourbon, Portland and hybrid perpetual roses.

The cultivar known as Rosa gallica forma trigintipetala or Rosa damascena 'Trigintipetala' is considered to be a synonym of Rosa × damascena.

'Celsiana' is a flowering semi-double variety.

== History ==
Rosa × damascena is a cultivated flower not found in the wild. Genetic tests indicate that it is a hybrid of R. moschata × R. gallica, crossed with the pollen of Rosa fedtschenkoana, which indicates a probable origin in the foothills of central Asia or Iran. There was a suggestion that Rosa phoenicia contributed to the genetic mix.

The French Crusader Robert de Brie, who took part in the Siege of Damascus in 1148 at the Second Crusade, is sometimes credited for bringing the Damask rose from Syria to Europe. The rose's name refers to the city of Damascus, Syria, known for its steel (Damascus steel), fabrics (Damask), and roses.

Other accounts say that the ancient Romans brought it to their colonies in England or that a physician of King Henry VIII, Thomas Linacre, gave him one circa 1540. The latter claim is dubious because Linacre died in 1524, 16 years before the rose's introduction to the royal garden.

There is a history of fragrance production in Kabul Province of Afghanistan from the Damask rose. An attempt has been made to restore this industry as an alternative for farmers who produce opium.

The flower, known in Hawaiian as Lokelani, is the official flower of the Island of Maui.

The Bengali writer Nirad Chaudhuri recalls that Hindus in East Bengal did not cultivate it because it was "looked upon as an Islamic flower".

== Cultivation ==
Rosa × damascena is optimally cultivated in hedgerows to help protect the blooms from wind damage and facilitate harvesting. In Bulgaria, damask roses are grown in long hedges, while in Turkey, individual plants are spaced apart along trenches. Gathering the flowers is intense manual labor. The harvesting period for roses depends on weather and location and can be as long as a month in cooler conditions and as short as 16-20 days in hotter seasons.

== Rose oil ==
Iran, Bulgaria, and Turkey are the major producers of rose oil from the cultivars of Rosa × damascena. France and India also contribute significantly to the market.

The cultivation of the "Bulgarian rose" as Rosa × damascena has been developed since Roman times. It is cultivated for commercial use in an area in the vicinity of Kazanlak and Karlovo in Bulgaria called the "Valley of Roses". The distillate from these roses is called "Bulgarian rose oil" and "Bulgarian rose otto". Families still operate small distilleries and produce what is denominated "village oil", but a state cooperative in Turkey's Isparta region carefully regulates the commercialization of rose oil. The roses are still grown by the family farms but are brought to stills established and regulated by the cooperative for distillation and quality control.

Damask Rose Cultivation and Processing
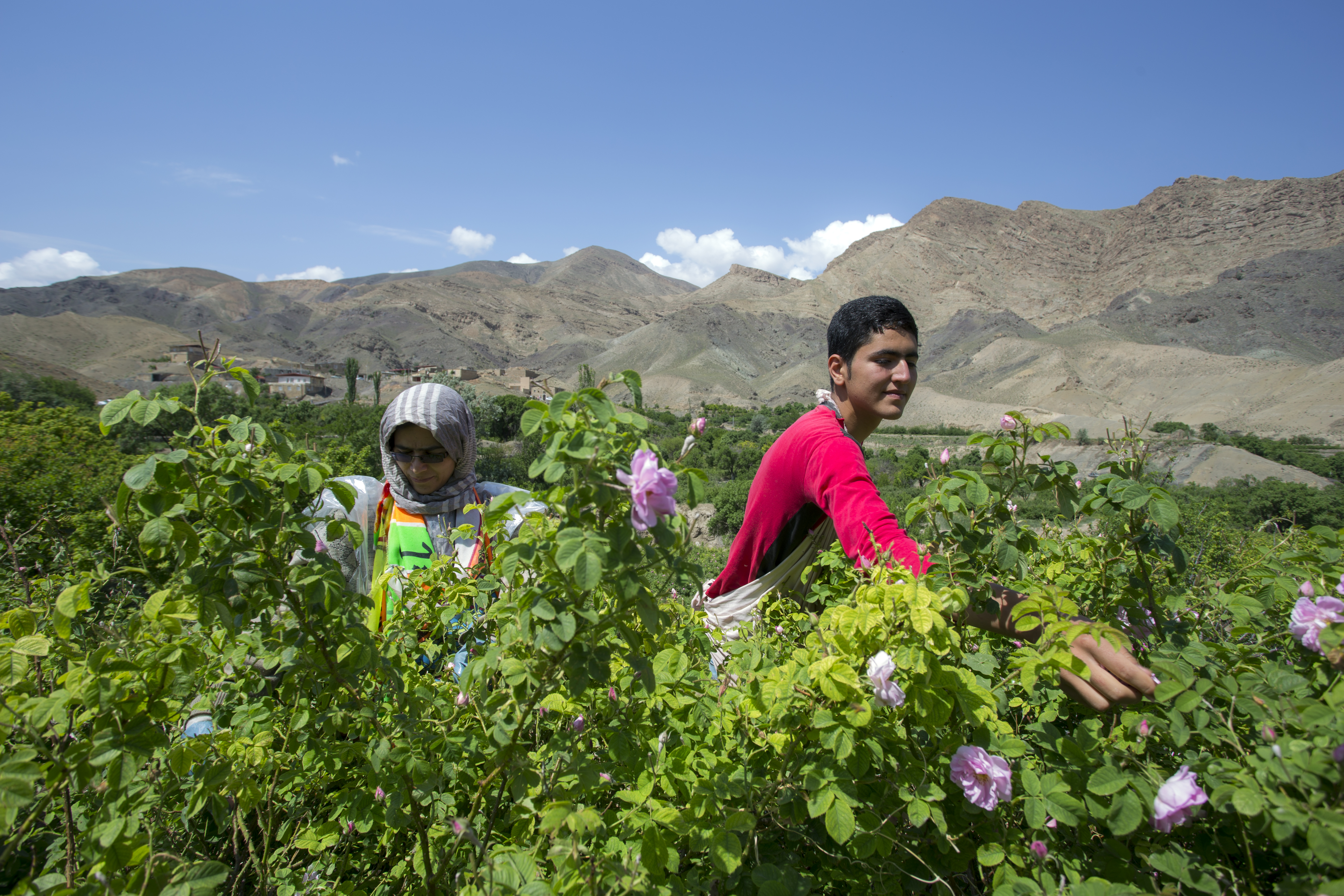
Damask roses being harvested in Isfahan Province, Iran

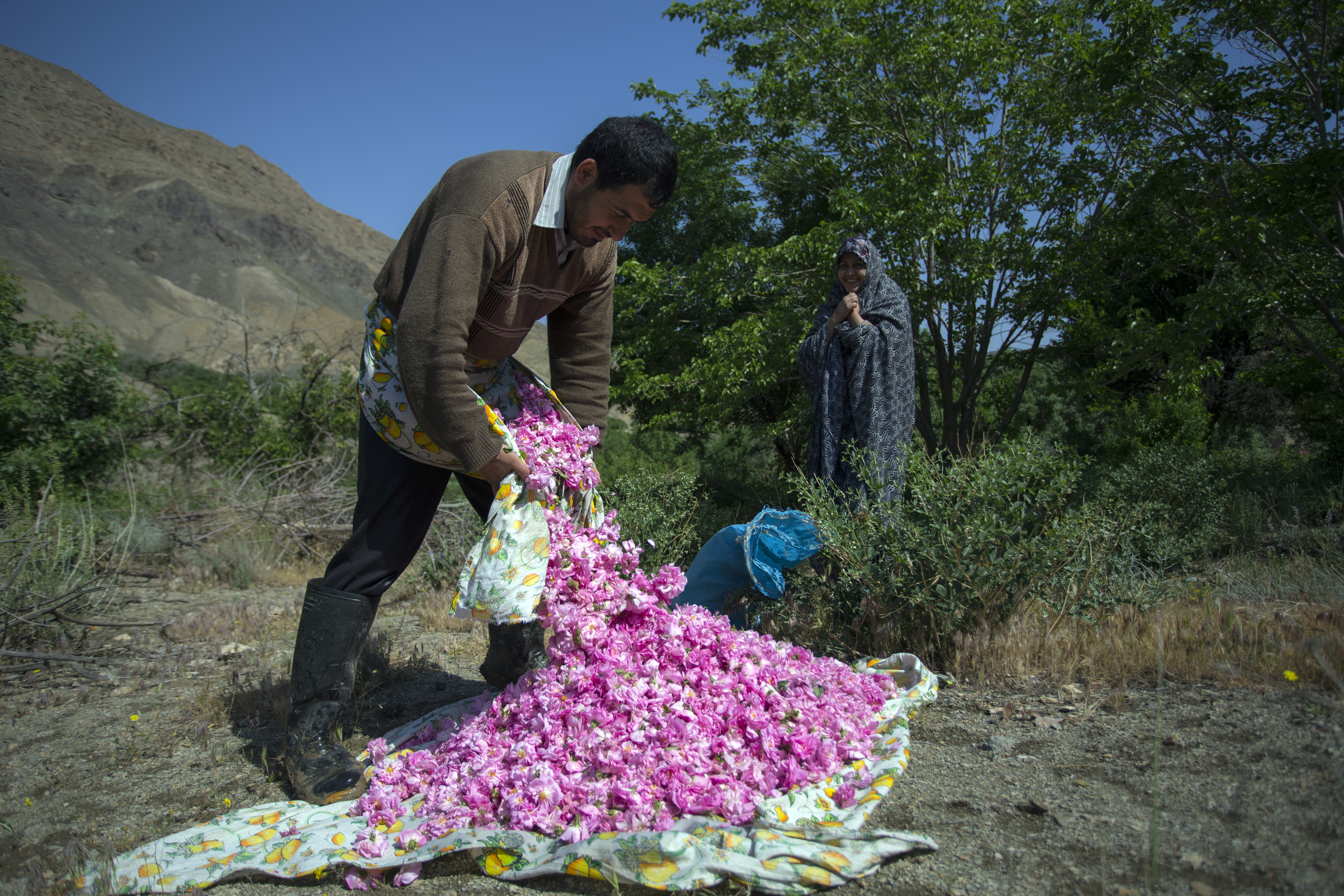
Harvested damask roses being piled together in the field, Isfahan Province, Iran

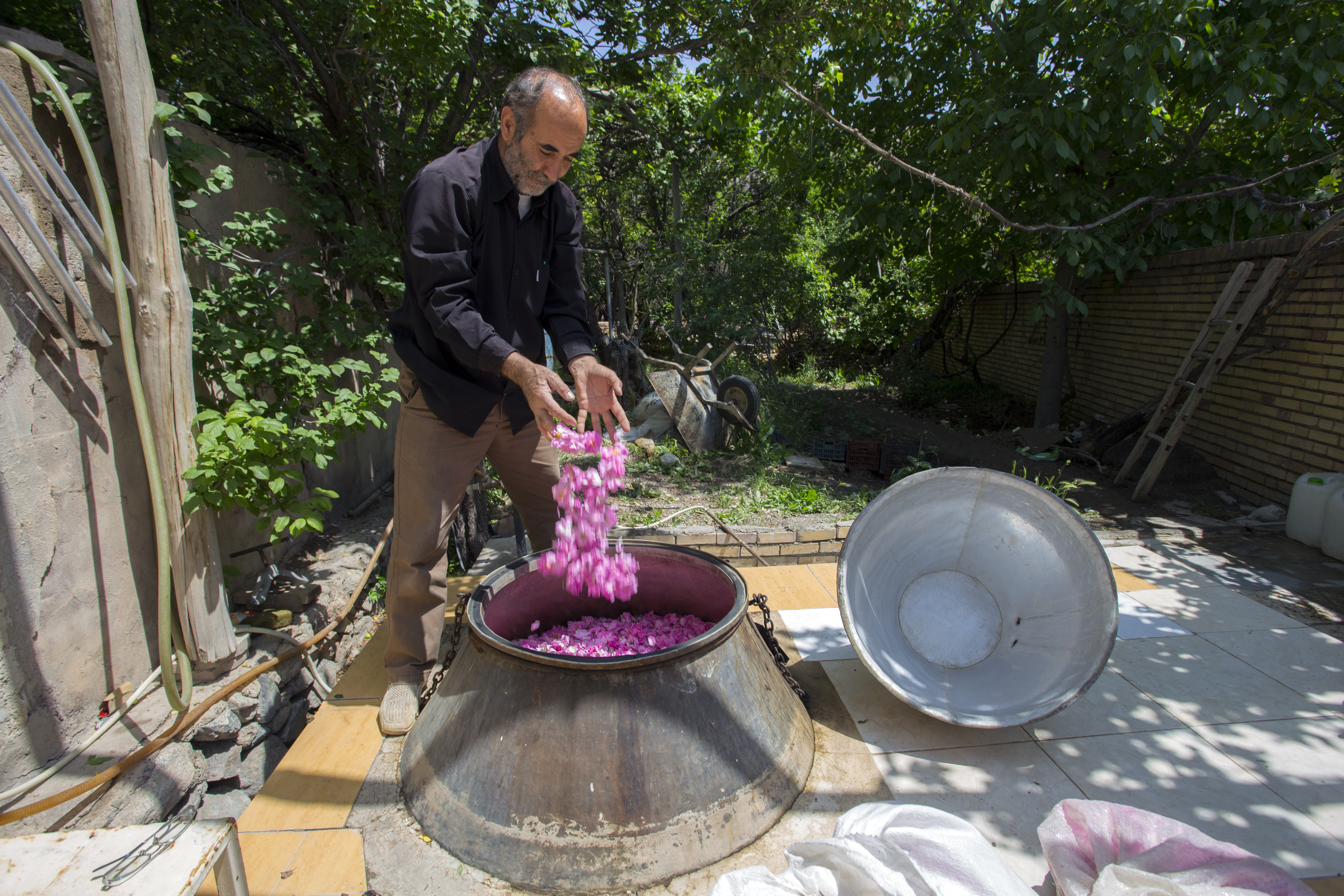
Rose blooms are added to a pot still for distillation.

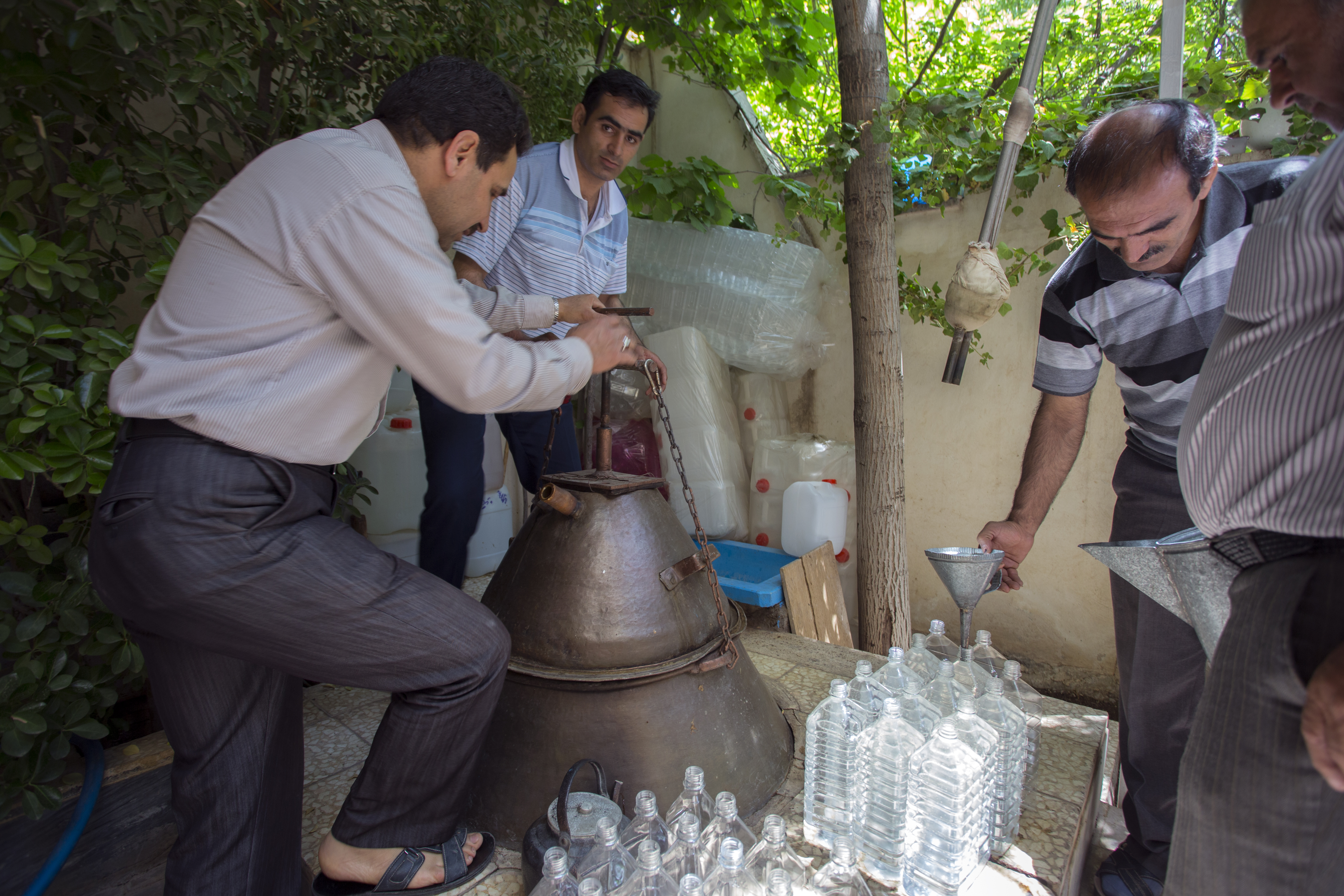
Rose water, distilled from fresh damask roses, is bottled for later use and distribution, Iran.

== Culinary uses ==
Damask roses are used in cooking as a flavoring ingredient or spice. They are an ingredient in the spice mixture denominated ras el hanout. Rose water and powdered roses are used in Middle Eastern and Indian cuisine. Rose water is often sprinkled on meat dishes, while rose powder is added to sauces. Chicken with rose is a popular Middle Eastern dish. Whole flowers, or petals, are also used in the herbal tea zuhurat. The most popular use is in the flavoring of desserts such as ice cream, jam, Turkish delights, rice pudding, yogurt, etc.

For centuries, the Damask rose has symbolized beauty and love. Its fragrance has been captured and preserved in the form of rose water by a method that can be traced to ancient times in the Middle East and later to the Indian subcontinent.

Modern Western cookery does not use roses or rose water much, but it was a popular ingredient in ancient times and remained popular well into the Renaissance. It was most commonly used in desserts, and is still used in traditional desserts. It has seen some revival in television cooking in the 21st century.

== Cultural Events ==
In Kazanlak, Bulgaria, the a rose festival is held every June. Folk dancing is performed, and rose cakes, soaps, rakia, and jewelry are sold. Rose picking and the distillation of roses are exhibited. There is a parade, with a high school aged "rose queen."

== See also ==
- Rose oil
- Miracle of the roses
