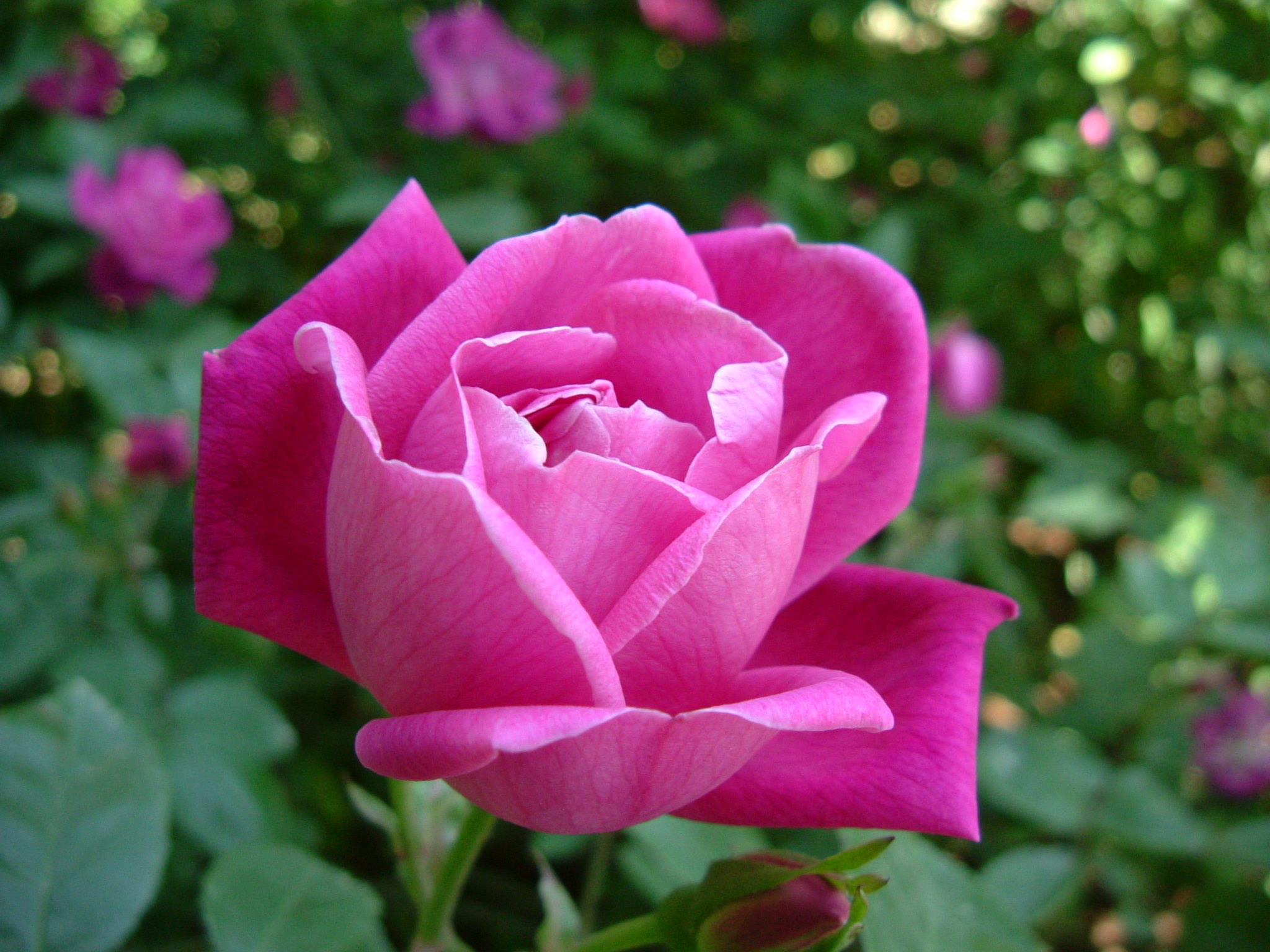
- A double-flowered cultivar

Scientific classification
- Kingdom: Plantae
- Clade: Tracheophytes
- Clade: Angiosperms
- Clade: Eudicots
- Clade: Rosids
- Order: Rosales
- Family: Rosaceae
- Genus: Rosa
- Species: R. chinensis

Binomial name
- Rosa chinensis Jacq.

Synonyms
- Rosa bengalensis Pers.; Rosa diversifolia Vent.; Rosa indica auct. non L.; Rosa laurentiae Tratt.; Rosa lawranceana Sweet; Rosa longifolia Willd.; Rosa mutabilis Correvon; Rosa nankinensis Lour.; Rosa nanula Hoffmanns.; Rosa rouletii Correvon; Rosa semperflorens W.M.Curtis

= Rosa chinensis =

Species of flowering plant

Rosa chinensis (Chinese: 月季; pinyin: yuèjì), known commonly as the China rose, Chinese rose, or Bengal rose, is a member of the genus Rosa native to Southwest China in Guizhou, Hubei, and Sichuan Provinces. The first publication of Rosa chinensis was in 1768 by Nikolaus Joseph von Jacquin in Observationum Botanicarum, 3, p. 7 & plate 55.

== Description ==
It is a shrub that reaches 1–2 m and grows in hedges or forms thickets. The leaves are pinnate, have 3–5 leaflets, each 2.5–6 cm long and 1–3 cm broad. In the wild species (sometimes listed as Rosa chinensis var. spontanea), the flowers have five pink to red petals. The fruit is a red hip one to two cm in diameter. The strong branches have a smooth purplish-brown bark, and there may be many to no curved, stocky, flat spines.

The alternately-arranged leaves, 12 to 27 cm long, are pinnately divided. The petiole and the rachis are sparsely spiny, with glandular hairs. The leaf blades usually have three or five or, rarely, seven leaflets, 2.5 to 6 centimeters in length, with a width of 1 to 3 centimeters, ovate or ovate-oblong with a weak-rounded or broad and wedge-shaped base, a more-or-less long, tapered apex and sharply toothed edge. The upper surface is shiny and dark green.

=== Inflorescence ===
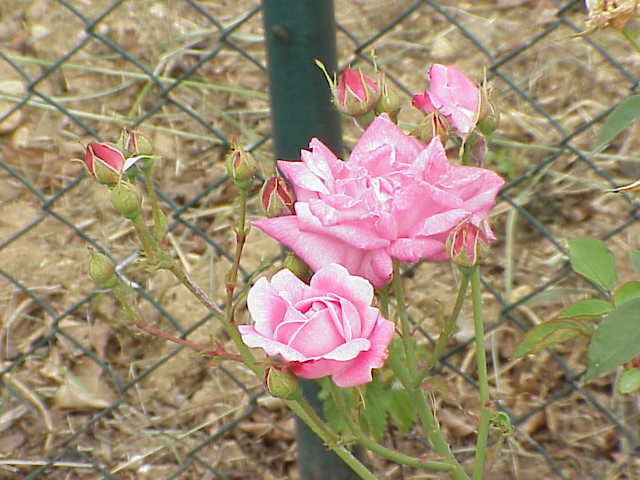
Rosa chinensis 'Old Blush'

In China, the flowering time of R. chinensis ranges from April to September. Flowers usually appear in groups of four or five, but may rarely appear as solitary flowers. The 2.5 to 6 cm long pedicel has variable hairiness. The one to three naked bracts are linear, with a pointed apex and a smooth or glandular margin. The flowers have a mild fragrance.

The hermaphrodite flowers have radial symmetry, with a diameter of four to five cm, and may be double. There are cultivated forms with simple to more or less strongly double flowers, which are also wild in China and nearby areas of temperate latitudes. The bald flower cup is egg-shaped, spherical or pear-shaped. The early-dropping sepals are ovate or sometimes leaf-like, simple or lobed, cupped towards the apex. The five to several or many petals are white-over-pink to red or purple, obovate with a wedge-shaped base and a rounded apex. There are many stamens. The free, hairy style is almost as long as the stamens. In China, the fruits ripen from June to November, turning red. They are egg-shaped to pear-shaped, with a diameter of one to two centimeters.

== Cultivation ==
Various forms of Rosa chinensis have been cultivated in gardens in China for a long time; therefore, it is not easy to distinguish between wild forms and cultivated forms. Many varieties of garden roses have been bred from Rosa chinensis. The species is extensively cultivated as an ornamental plant, and numerous cultivars have been selected, which are known as the China roses. It has also been extensively interbred with Rosa gigantea to produce Rosa × odorata and by further hybridization the tea roses and hybrid tea roses, and is the source of summer-blooming varieties and those with continuous flowering.

=== Varieties ===
Three varieties of the species are recognized in the Flora of China:

- R. chinensis var. chinensis, originated in cultivation, with red petals
- R. chinensis var. spontanea, native to Guizhou, Hubei, and Sichuan, with red petals
- R. chinensis var. semperflorens (Curtis) Koehne, originated in cultivation, with dark red or purple petals

== Uses ==
Cultivars developed from Rosa chinensis have been important in the breeding of many modern garden roses by providing the repeat-blooming characteristic, although this is not a feature of the wild species. The many forms of Rosa chinensis are also used in many other ways. The young vegetative plant parts, flower buds and flowers are brewed and eaten as a kitchen herb, for example, as a soup. From the rosehips, a thin fleshy layer that surrounds the seeds is eaten raw or cooked. The seed hair must be removed; it has to be handled very carefully. The seed hairs must not get into the mouth and throat. The seeds are a good source of vitamin E. The seeds can be ground and mixed with flour or added to other foods.

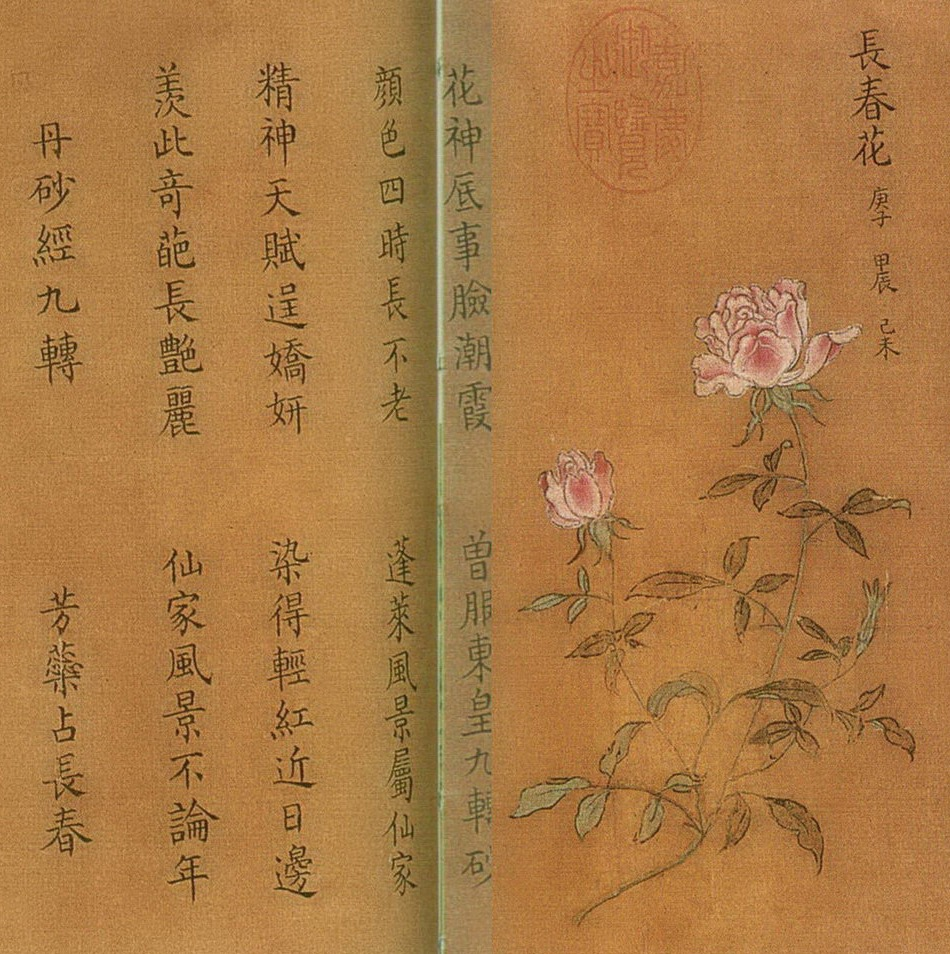
13th-century painting of Rosa chinensis 'Old Blush'

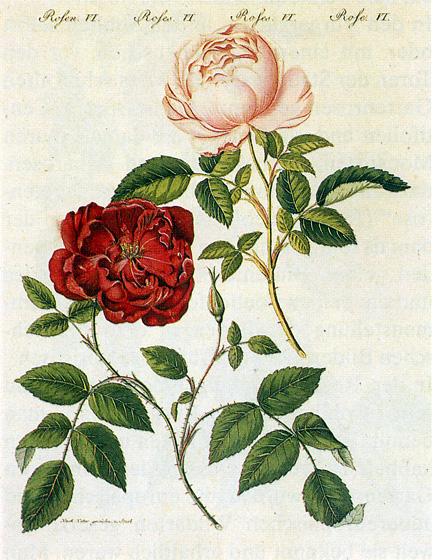
18th-century painting of two cultivars

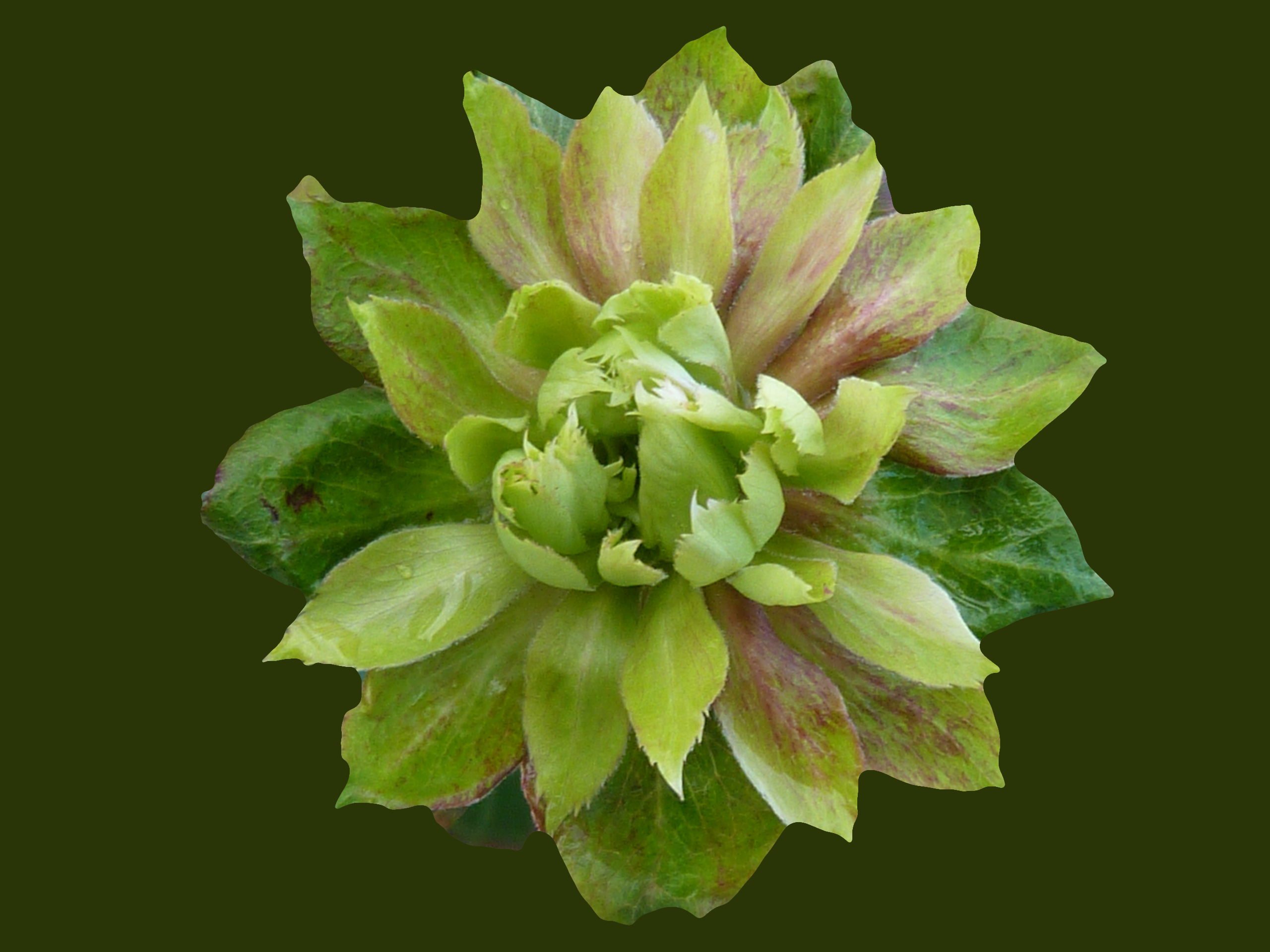
Rosa chinensis 'Viridiflora', in which the petals are replaced with leaves (phyllody)

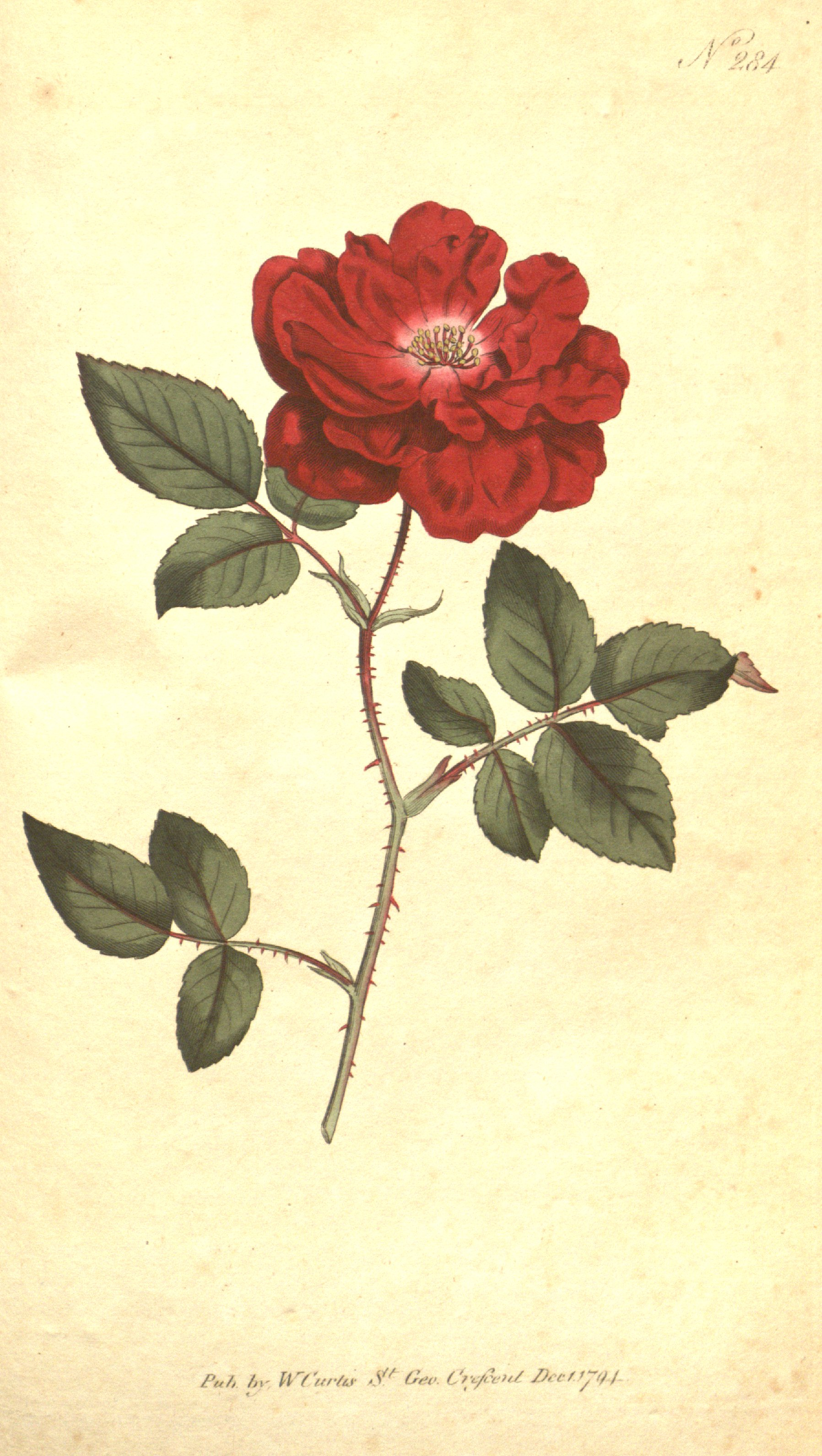
Botanical illustration

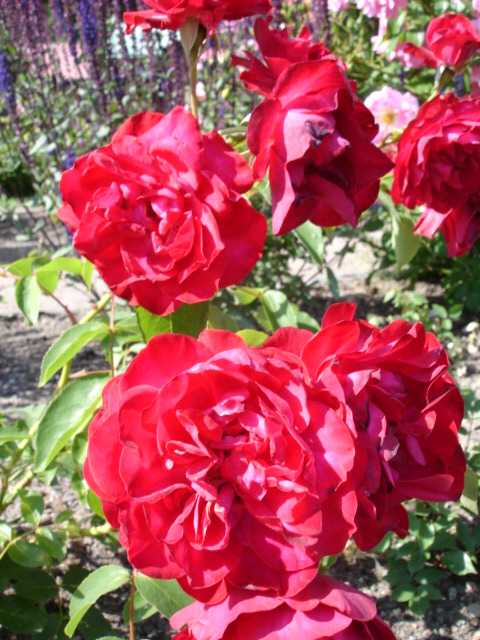
Rose 'Bengal Red'

== See also ==
- Garden roses
