= Rose seed oil =

Oil from the seeds of rose plants

Rose seed oil is a vegetable seed oil, most commonly extracted from the wild rose bush Rosa rubiginosa (Spanish: rosa mosqueta) in the southern Andes, or Rosa canina - a wild rose species native to Europe, northwest Africa, and western Asia. Rose fruits have been used in folk medicine.

== Nutrition ==
Analysis with GC-MS showed among many others the following major components in oil samples: Vitispiran, α-E-acaridial, dodecanoic acid, hexadecanoic acid, docosane, ionone, 6-methyl-5-hepten-2-one, 2-heptanone, heptanal, myristic acid, linolic acid.

Rose hip seed oil contains significant amounts of the two polyunsaturated essential fatty acids linoleic acid, linolenic acid, as well as of the monounsaturated oleic acid.

It also contains antioxidants including δ- and γ-tocopherol, carotenoids, and phenolic compounds.

The oil does not contain vitamin A directly, however it contains provitamin A (mostly beta-Carotene). It also contains all-trans retinoic acid.

== Research directions ==
Researchers have tested the efficacy of topical rose hip seed oil together with an oral fat-soluble vitamins on different inflammatory dermatitis such as eczema, neurodermatitis, and cheilitis, with promising findings of the topical use of rose hip seed oil on these inflammatory dermatome. Due its high composition of UFAs and antioxidants, rose hip oil has relatively high protection against inflammation and oxidative stress.
