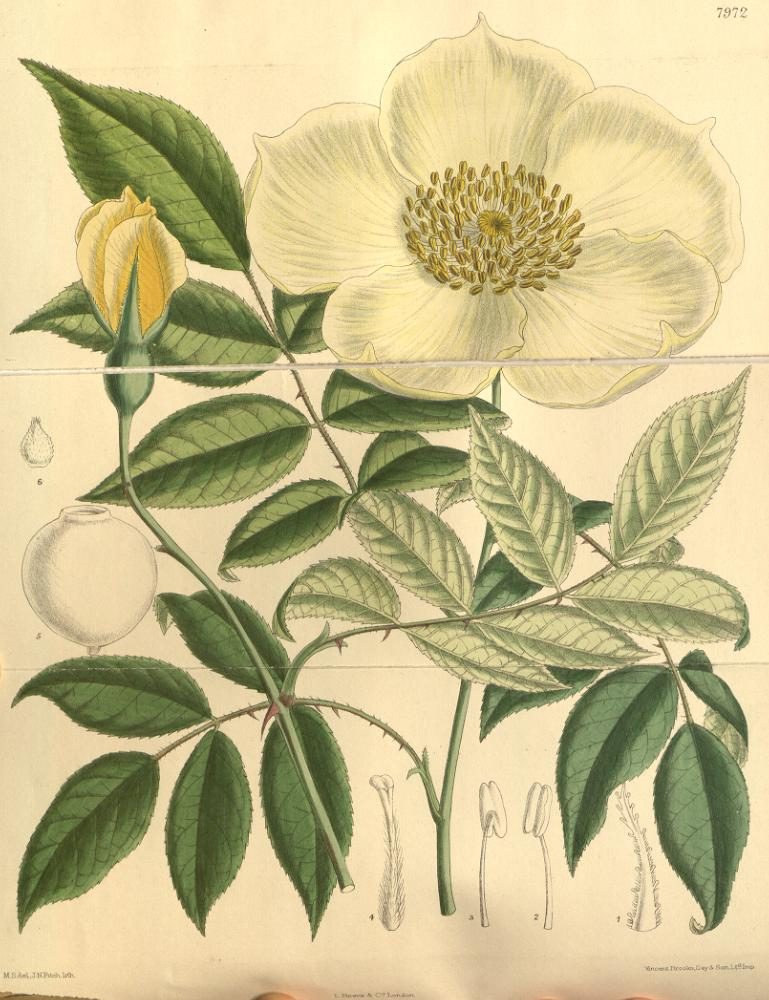

Scientific classification
- Kingdom: Plantae
- Clade: Tracheophytes
- Clade: Angiosperms
- Clade: Eudicots
- Clade: Rosids
- Order: Rosales
- Family: Rosaceae
- Genus: Rosa
- Species: R. gigantea

Binomial name
- Rosa gigantea Collett ex Crép.

Synonyms
- Rosa xanthocarpa G.Watt ex E.Willm.

= Rosa gigantea =

Species of flowering plant

Rosa gigantea is a species of rose native to northeast India, northern Myanmar and southwest China (Yunnan) in the foothills of the Himalaya at 1000–1500 m altitude. It is sometimes considered to be a variety of Rosa odorata, as R. odorata var. gigantea.

As its name suggests, it is the largest species of rose, climbing 20 m or more into the crowns of other trees by means of its stout, hooked thorns, and with a trunk up to 50 cm diameter. The leaves are semi-evergreen, 15–25 cm long, pinnate, with usually 7 leaflets, each leaflet 4–8 cm long. The flowers are white, creamy or yellow, the largest of any wild rose, 10–14 cm diameter. The hips are yellow or orange, 2.5–3.5 cm diameter, hard, and often lasting through the winter into the following spring, often still present at the same time as the next years' flowers.

Another rose, described from Manipur in 1888 as R. macrocarpa and R. xanthocarpa by Sir George Watt, an authority on Indian roses, is now generally considered to be the same species as R. gigantea. The distinct characteristics claimed for R. macrocarpa (deeper yellow flowers, larger foliage with 4 to 7 leaflets and large yellow fruits) are not consistent.

After gene sequencing was carried out in 2018, it was found that Rosa roxburghii is closely related to Rosa odorata var. gigantea.
