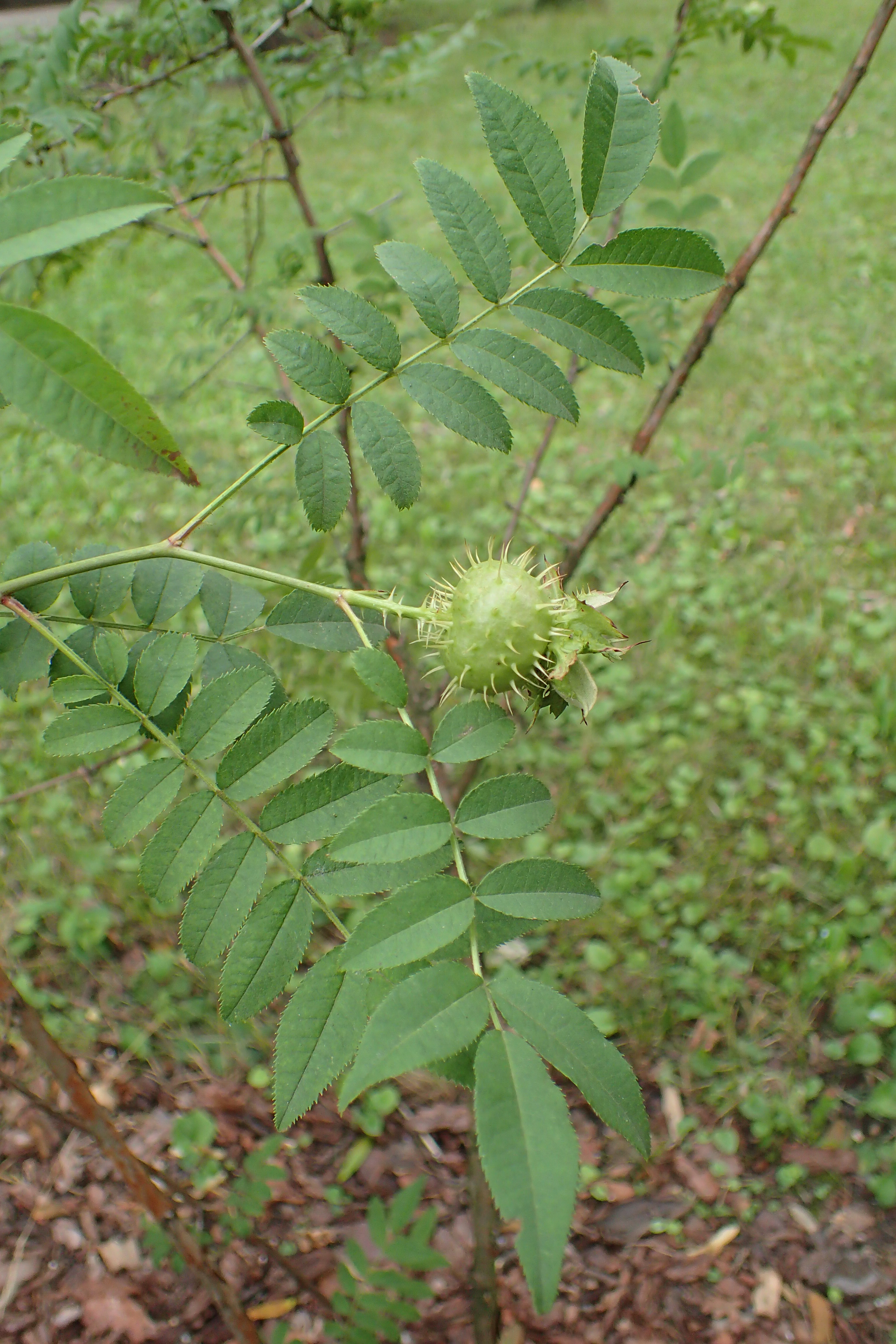
- Unripe hip
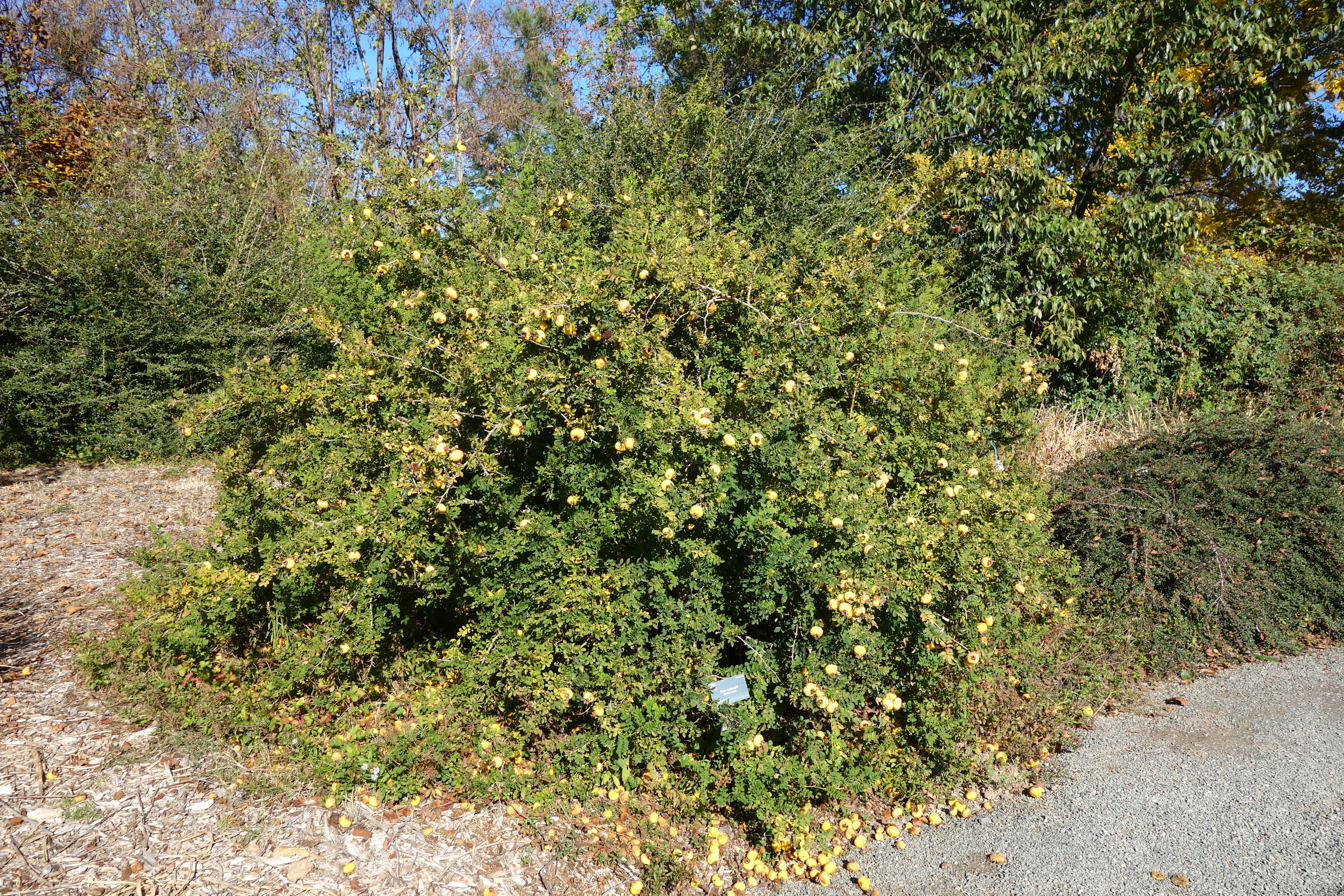
- Habit

Scientific classification
- Kingdom: Plantae
- Clade: Tracheophytes
- Clade: Angiosperms
- Clade: Eudicots
- Clade: Rosids
- Order: Rosales
- Family: Rosaceae
- Genus: Rosa
- Species: R. roxburghii

Binomial name
- Rosa roxburghii Tratt.

Synonyms
- List: Juzepczukia microphylla Chrshan.; Juzepczukia roxburghii (Tratt.) Chrshan.; Platyrhodon microphyllum Hurst; Rosa forrestii Focke; Rosa microphylla Pamp.; Rosa microphylla var. plena Rehder; Rosa roxbourgii Tratt.; Rosa roxburghii f. esetosa T.C.Ku; Rosa roxburghii f. normalis Rehder & E.H.Wilson; Rosa roxburghii var. plena Rehder; Saintpierrea microphylla Germ.

= Rosa roxburghii =

Species of plant

Rosa roxburghii (burr rose, chestnut rose, chinquapin rose, or cili), is a species of flowering plant in the family Rosaceae, native to the eastern Himalayas, Tibet, and central and southern China. In the wild, it is found in thickets, mountain forests, on slopes, and alongside streams, typically 500 to 1,400 m (1,600 to 4,600 ft) above sea level. A diffuse shrub capable of reaching 8 m (26 ft) but usually shorter, it is available from commercial suppliers. In China, it is cultivated for its vitamin C-rich hips on 170,000 ha (420,000 acres), mostly in Guizhou.

It was dedicated to William Roxburgh, a Scottish physician and botanist who was director of the Calcutta Botanical Garden.

Three forms have been recognized: Rosa roxburghii f. roxburghii, which has double or semi-double, reddish or pink flowers 5–6 cm (2.0–2.4 in) in diametre, Rosa roxburghii f. normalis Rehder & E. H. Wilson (in Sargent, Pl. Wilson. 2: 318. 1915), which has simple, pink flowers 4–6 cm (1.6–2.4 in) in diametre and also, Rosa roxburghii f. hirtula (Regel) (Rehder and Wilson), flowers single, pale pink or lilac-pink from Japan.

== Taxonomy ==
R. roxburghii is also known commonly as the 'sweet chestnut rose', the 'chestnut rose', the 'burr rose', and the 'chinquapin rose'. It is sometimes referred to as the 'thorn pear' or 'Chinese prickly pear', a direct translation of the Chinese name (刺梨; cìlí).

It gets its common name 'chestnut rose' from the large burred hips that look like chestnuts.

It was originally found in China in the early 1800s, where it had been growing for generations, and it is rarely grown in European gardens. It was then introduced to the botanic garden in Calcutta around 1824.

In 1823, Trattinick changed the name of a species of rose. It was originally named Rosa microphylla by Dr. William Roxburgh (1751-1815) in 1820, because René Louiche Desfontaines had previously applied the name microphylla to an unrelated European species of rose in 1798. It then became Rosa roxburghii, and Trattinick published this name change in 'Rosacearum monographia' on page 233 in 1823. Rosacearum monographia ('Monograph of the Rose Family') covered generic and species descriptions of plants in the rose family, although it was not illustrated.

The specific epithet was spelled roxbourgii in the protologue, but roxburghii is more commonly used.

The etymological root of the binomial name Rosa is from the ancient Latin name for the rose. The Latin specific epithet of Roxburghii was named after John Roxburgh (1770s–1820s), an occasional overseer of Calcutta Botanic Garden.

It was verified as Rosa roxburghii by United States Department of Agriculture and the Agricultural Research Service on 15 February 1996, and is listed as Rosa roxburghii in the Encyclopedia of Life.

Rosa roxburghii f. normalis is an accepted name by the RHS and listed in the RHS Plant Finder book.

It is also often sold under the name Rosa roxburghii 'plena'. Normally, advertised as a medium pink double form, but a deeper pink version is available from nurseries.

It belongs to the section 'Microphyllae' which also includes the Japanese species, R. hirtula.

After gene sequencing was carried out it was found that R. roxburghii is closely related to Rosa odorata var. gigantea.

== Distribution and habitat ==
Rosa roxburghii is native to temperate areas of eastern Asia, within China and Japan.

=== Range ===
Found within China, it is found in the provinces of Anhui, Zhejiang, Fujian, Hunan, Hubei, Gansu, Jiangxi, Guizhou, Shaanxi, Sichuan, Yunnan, Guangxi and Xinjiang.

=== Habitat ===
It is found growing in various habitats, including mountain forests, thickets, slopes, stream sides, semi-arid river valleys, waysides, and on roadsides. In China, it is commonly found on banks between rice fields, where it can obtain plenty of water during the summer.

They can be found at an altitude of 500–2,500 m (1,600–8,200 ft) above sea level.

== Uses ==
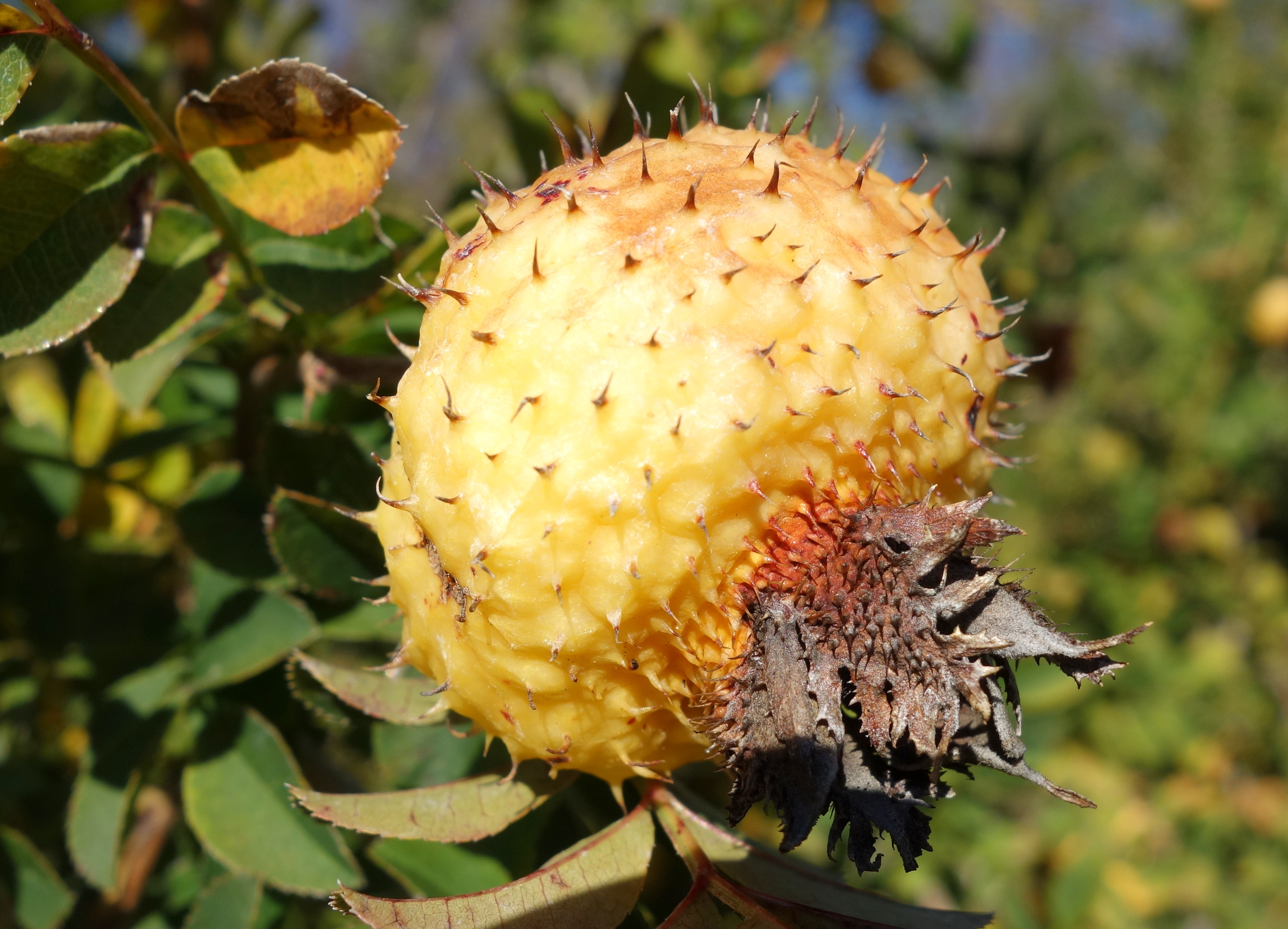
Rosa roxburghii in Quarryhill Botanical Garden, California

Rosa roxburghii has various uses, including as an ornamental, as a food source, and in traditional medicine.

The edible fruits have a sweet, sour taste. The species is cultivated for its showy flowers, or as a hedge because of its abundant prickles.

=== Food source ===
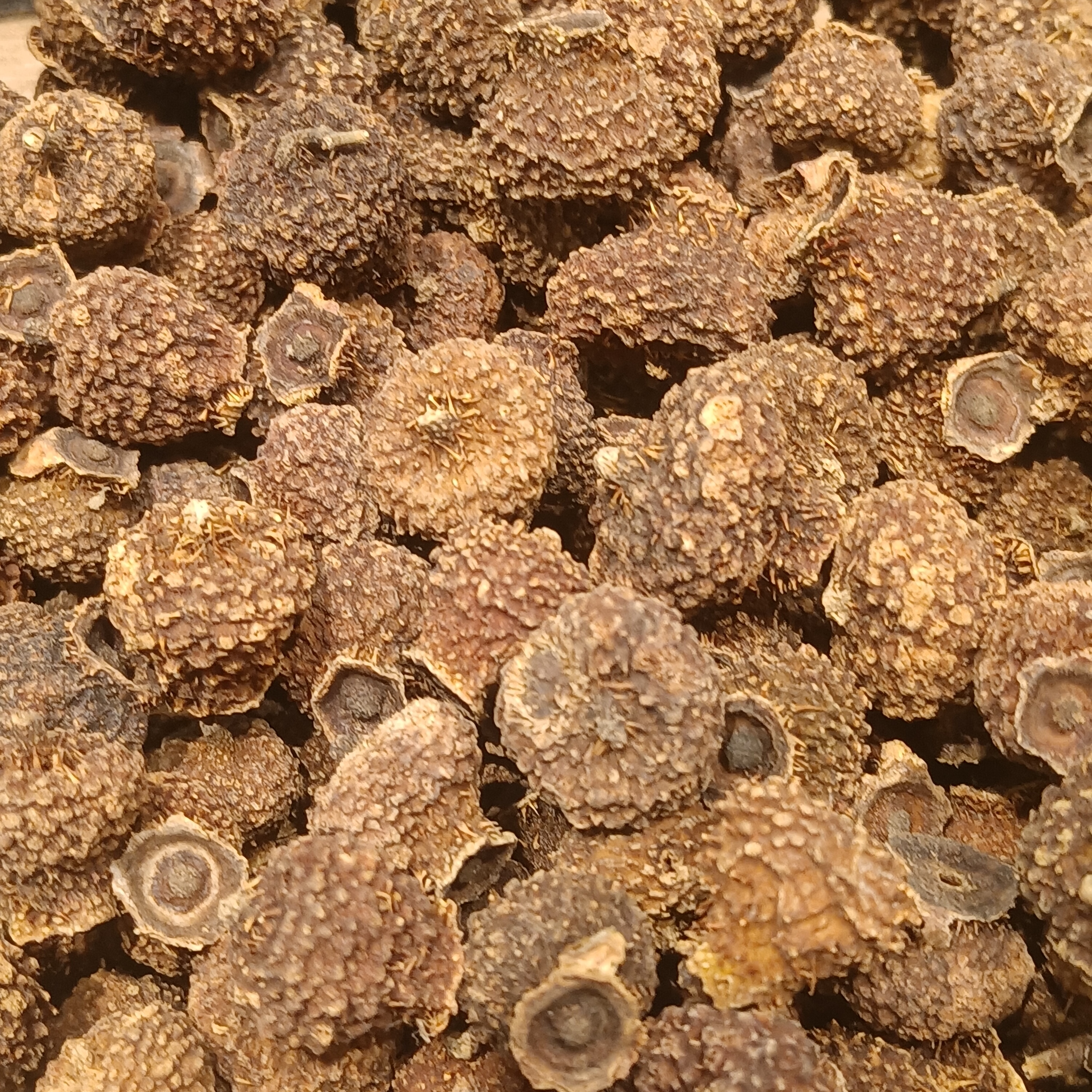
Dried cili from Guizhou, China

Rosa roxburghii and Rosa sterilis have edible fruits eaten since 1765. The fruit (rosehips) can be eaten raw or cooked, and has a sweet and sour taste. The fruit is rich in vitamin E and vitamin C. The vitamin C content is 5-7% of the total fruit mass.

The phytochemical characteristics of the fruit include 135 volatile organic compounds and 59 compounds in methanol extracts, including 13 organic acids, 12 flavonoids, 11 triterpenes, nine amino acids, five phenylpropanoid derivatives, four condensed tannins, two stilbenes, two benzaldehyde derivatives, and one benzoic acid derivative. Roxbins A and B were also found in the fruit.

There is only a thin layer of edible flesh surrounding the many seeds. It can be ground into a powder, and mixed with flour or added to other foods as a supplement. In China, it is the commercial source of rosehip powder.

While being edible, there are some hazards of eating Rosa roxburghii. There is a layer of hairs around the seeds just beneath the flesh of the fruit. These hairs can cause irritation to the mouth and digestive tract if ingested.

=== In culture ===
The Japanese name for the chestnut rose is izayoibara, (十六夜薔薇). Izayoi (十六夜), literally "sixteenth night", is the first moonrise after a full moon, which in turn alludes to the morphology of the flower lacking a petal, making it seem as if it has a notch at one side.

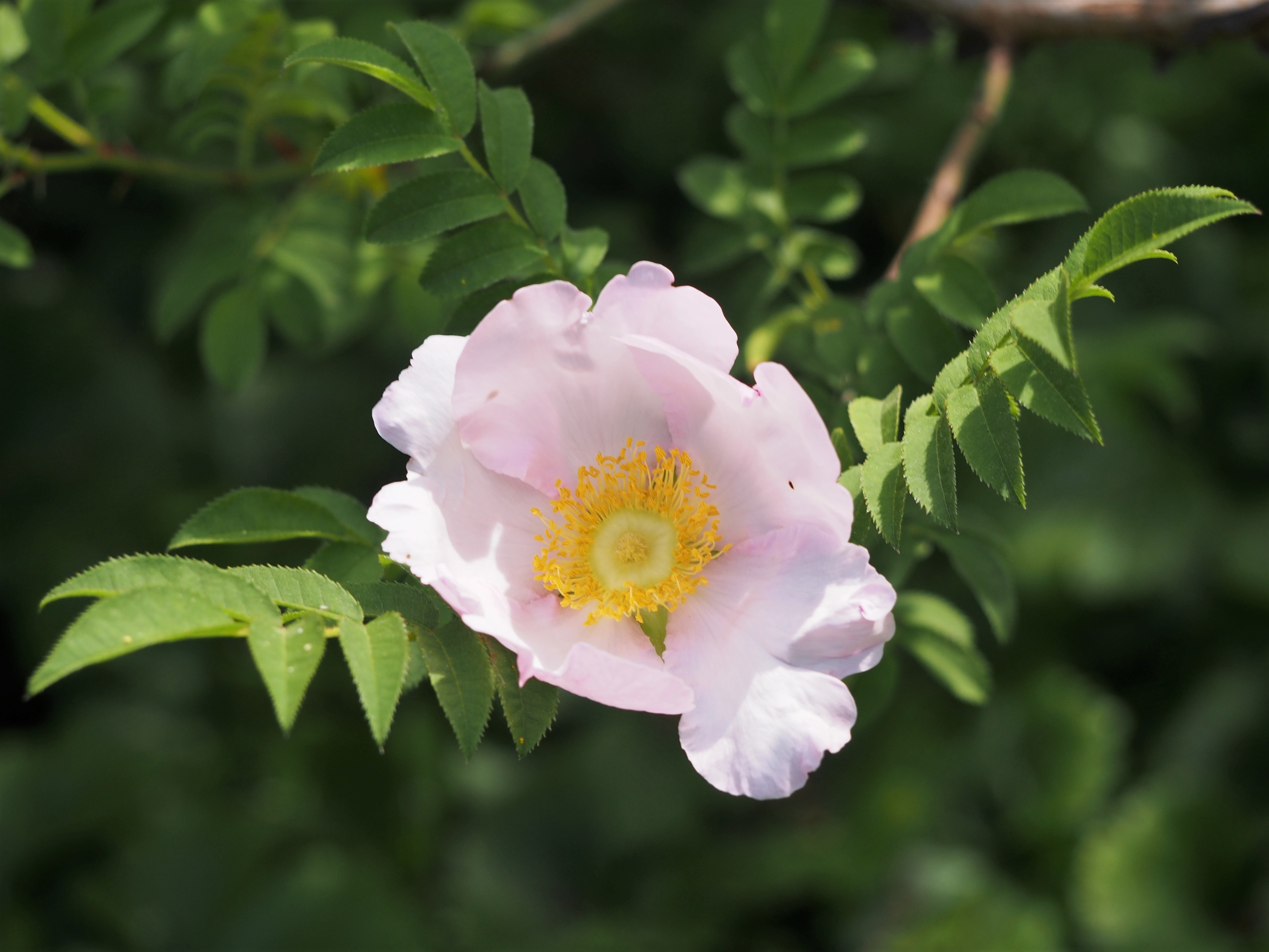
Flower

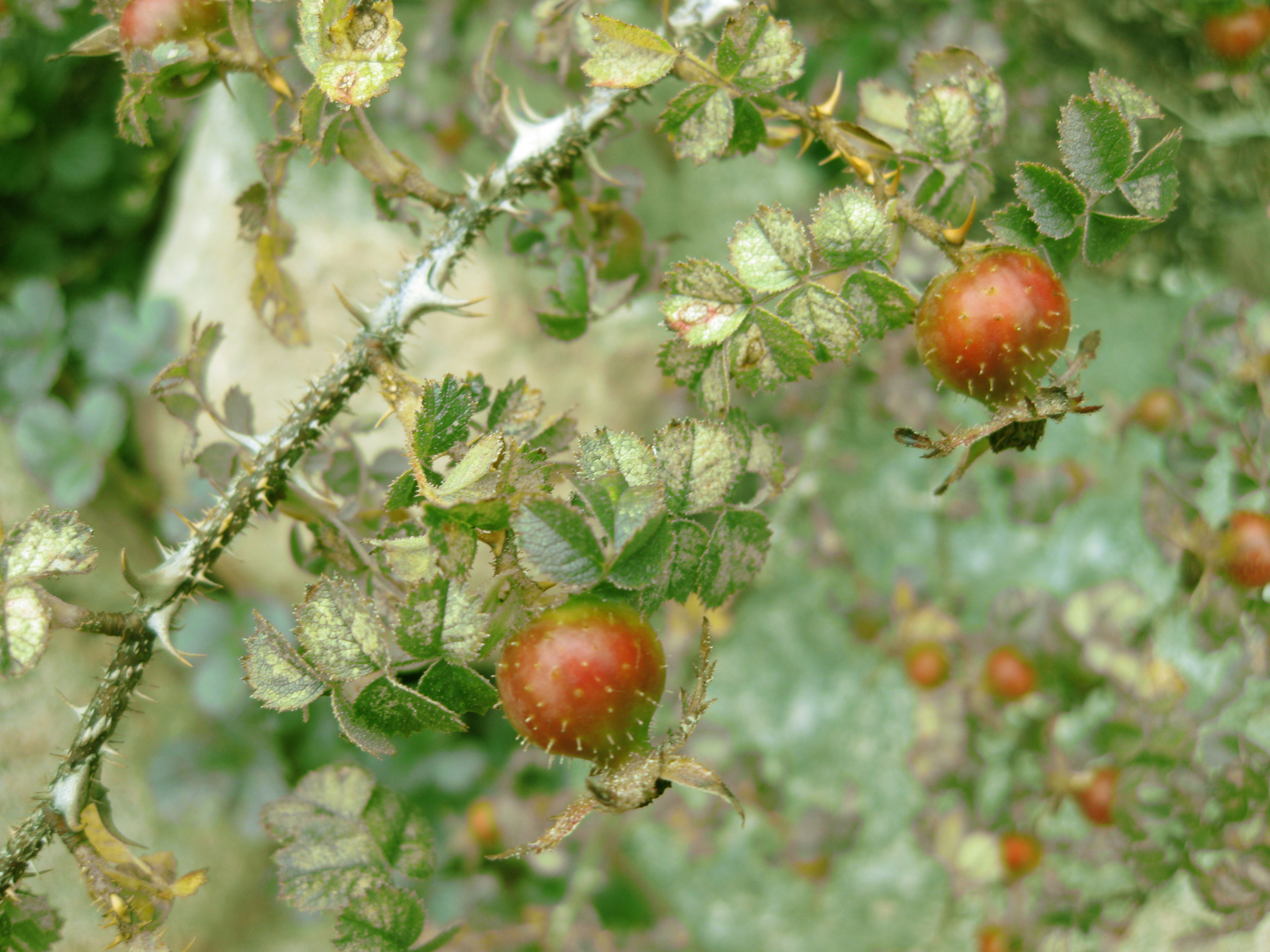
Ripe hips

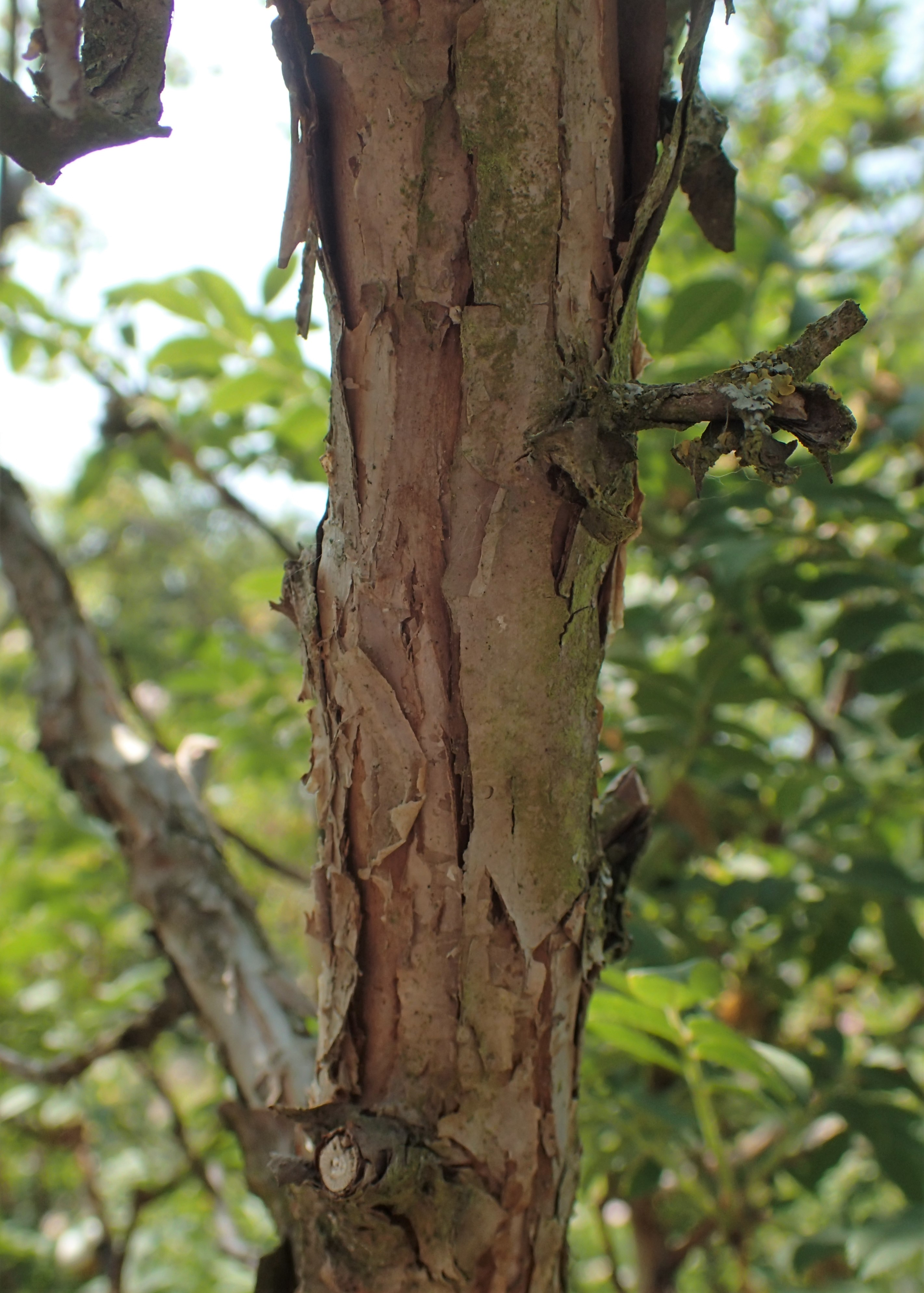
Stem

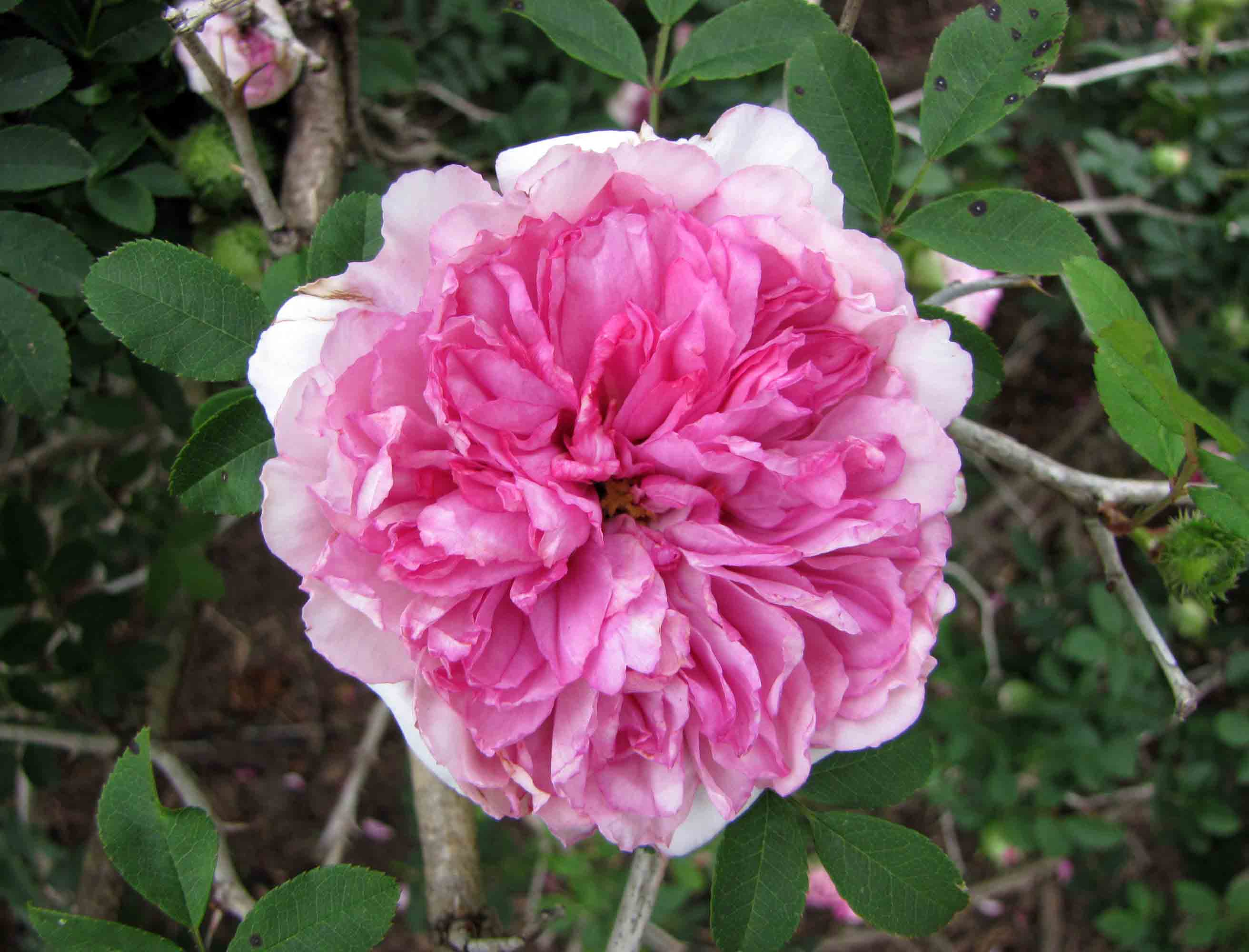
'Plena' cultivar
