= Hagebuttenmark =

Sweet spread made from rose hips

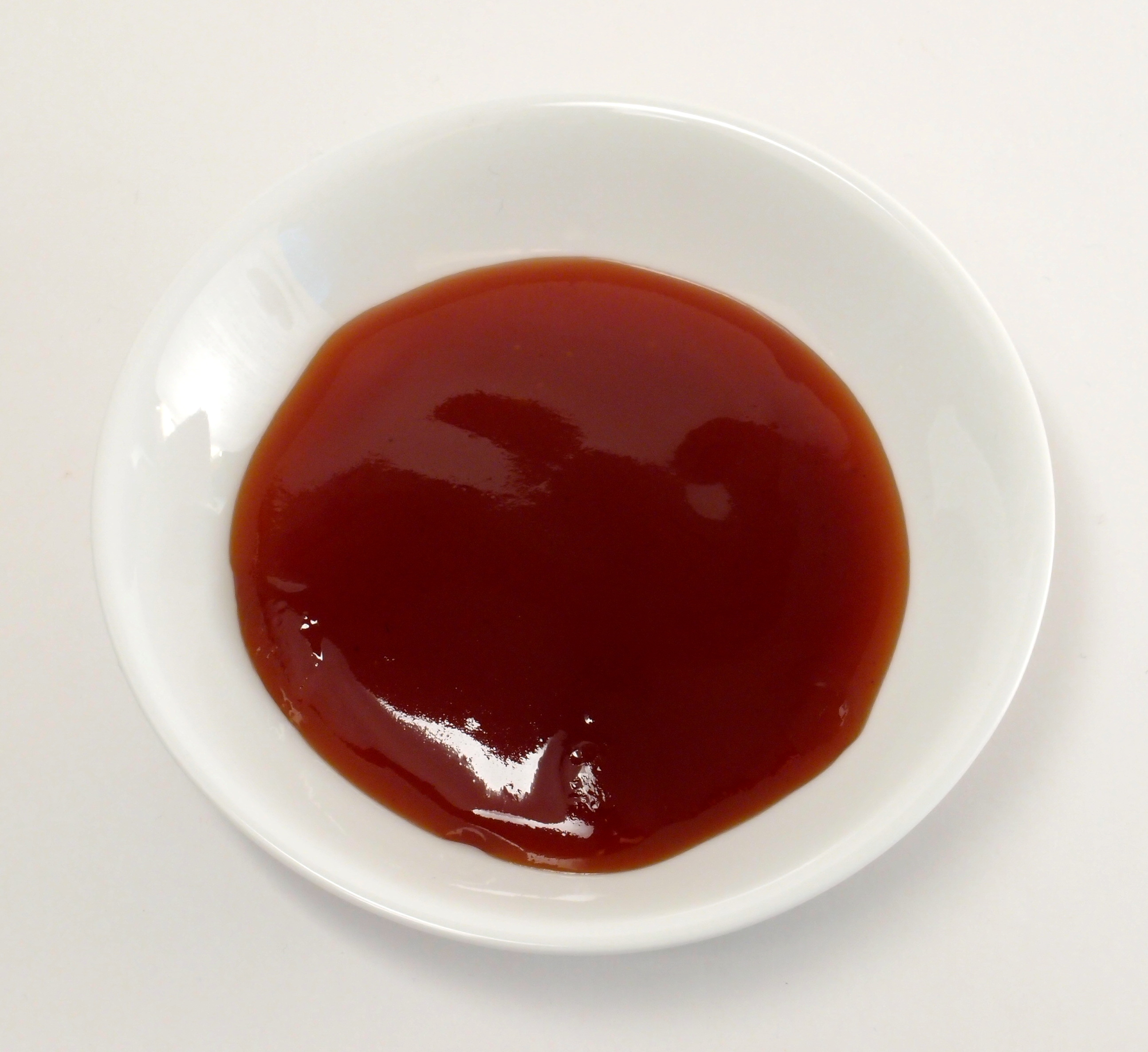
- Type: Spread
- Place of origin: Germany; Switzerland
- Main ingredients: Rose hips, sugar, sometimes red wine

Hagebuttenmark, also called Hägenmark (Swabian dialect), Hiffenmark (East Franconian dialect) is the traditional name for a fruit preserve made from rose hips, sugar, and sometimes red wine. Buttenmost (Switzerland), refers to the unsweetened base product made from only rose hips and water.

In the past, preserves were an important source of vitamin C. In addition, rose hips can be harvested and processed into the preserve in winter. Hagebuttenmark is used as a spread on bread, as sweetener in beverages and as condiment on desserts and pastries. It is, for example, the typical filling for Krapfen in Franconia.

== Food law aspects ==
In the European Union, commercially produced Hagebuttenmark has to be declared as "Hagebuttenkonfitüre extra" or "Konfitüre einfach" (fruit preserve onefold). Since the "Hagebuttenkonfitüre extra" with kernels is not edible, there's a special provision that allows declaration of the Hagebuttenmark (without kernels) as "Konfitüre extra". If it is produced in raw processing (see Preparation), it may not be named "Konfitüre" as it does not contain the required anhydrous mass of 60%.

== Preparation ==
Generally there are two ways of prepare Hagebuttenmark:

1. In the most common method used by big companies, firstly the rose hips are seeded, then the seeds are cooked with little water or wine, then drained, the liquid so obtained together with the pulp is then let to brew for few hours to a few days. Then the pulp is cooked and puréed, mixed with sugar in a one-to-one rate, cooked again and then filled hot in jars. This kind of preparation guarantees a long shelf life but, as Vitamin C is not heat-resistant, only traces of it remain in the finished product.
2. In the traditional Swabian method the rose hips are cut open and stored until they are soft (that takes for about 5 days in a temperature of 12 °C (54 °F)). Then they are filtered through a sieve without being cooked. This pulp is then heated with sugar to a temperature between 65 °C (149 °F) and 75 °C (167 °F) (but it can also be mixed cool with honey) and then flavoured with wine, orange juice or apple juice.

With the second method, the preserve is very rich in Vitamin C. It is the typical preparation in Auendorf, a village that belongs to Bad Ditzenbach that is called "Hägenmarkdorf" ("dorf" being the German word for "village") and is the only village in Germany that features rose hips in their coat of arms.

== See also ==
- Culinary Heritage of Switzerland
- List of spreads
