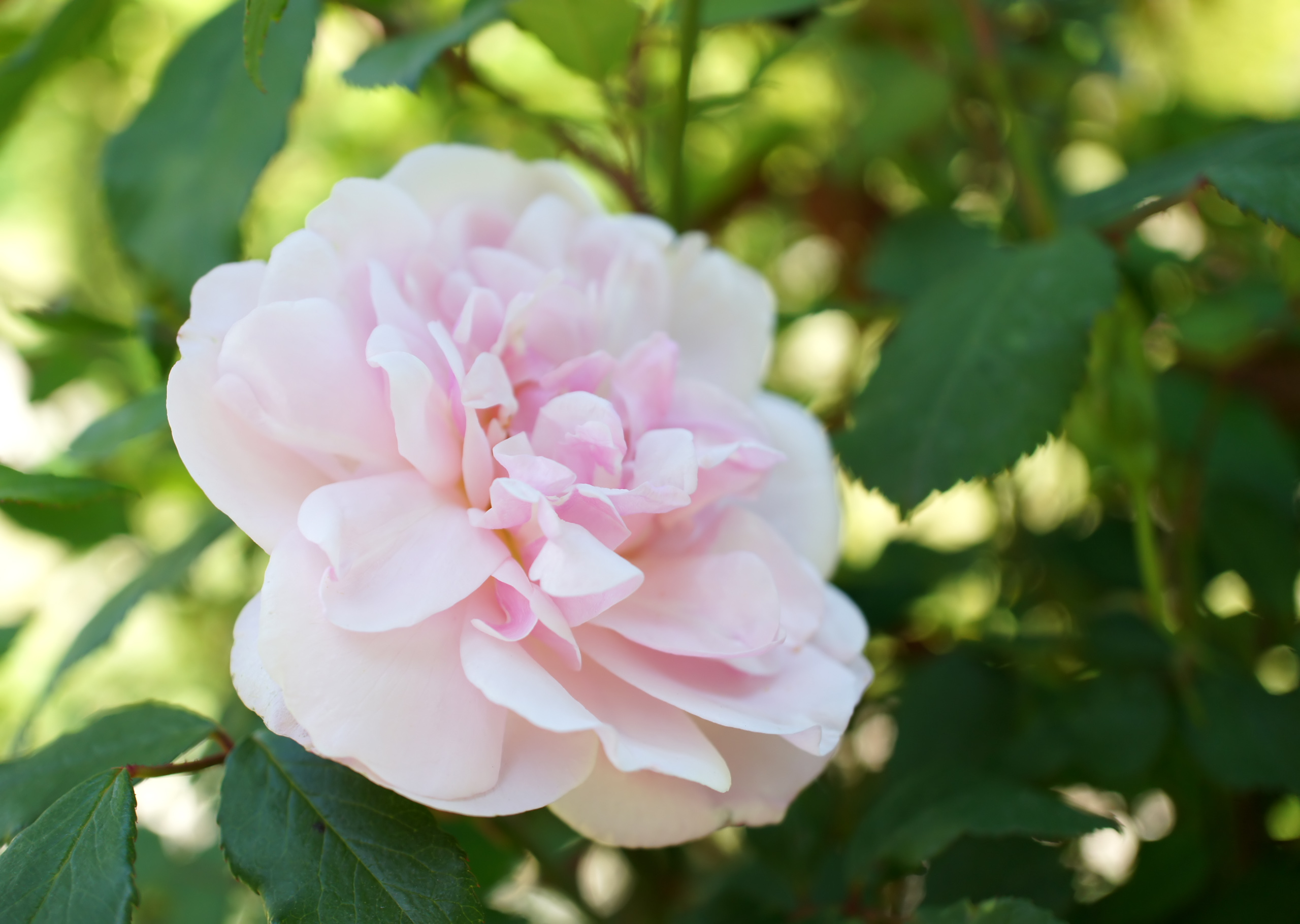
- 'Hume's Blush Tea-scented China'

Scientific classification
- Kingdom: Plantae
- Clade: Tracheophytes
- Clade: Angiosperms
- Clade: Eudicots
- Clade: Rosids
- Order: Rosales
- Family: Rosaceae
- Genus: Rosa
- Species: R. × odorata

Binomial name
- Rosa × odorata (Andrews) Sweet

Synonyms
- Rosa gechouitangensis H.Lév.; Rosa odoratissima Sweet ex Lindl.; Rosa oulengensis H.Lév.; Rosa pseudindica Lindl.; Rosa pseudoindica Lindl. [Spelling variant]; Rosa thea Savi; Rosa tongtchouanensis H.Lév.

= Rosa × odorata =

Species of flowering plant

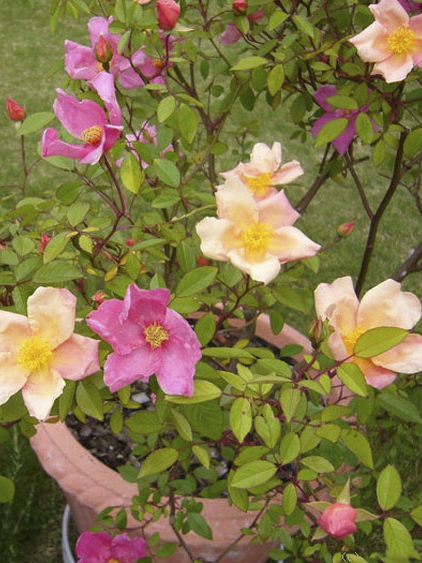
'Mutabilis'

Rosa × odorata or Rosa odorata is a hybrid flowering plant of the genus Rosa native to Yunnan in southwest China, whose taxonomy has been confused. It has been considered a hybrid of Rosa gigantea and Rosa chinensis, or as a quite rare wild species that includes R. gigantea. The wild forms are cultivated to some extent. Cultivars were developed in China in ancient times from R. chinensis crosses, and these have been important in the ancestry of the tea-scented China roses, also called tea roses, and their descendants the hybrid tea roses.

== Varieties ==
Four varieties of the species are recognized in the Flora of China:

- R. odorata var. odorata, with white or pink-and-white petals
- R. odorata var. gigantea, see Rosa gigantea, with white petals
- R. odorata var. pseudoindica, with yellow or orange petals
- R. odorata var. erubescens, with pale pink petals

== Cultivars ==
The cultivar R. odorata 'Mutabilis' is widely cultivated, and is notable for the fact that the blooms change colour from yellow to pink. Growing to 1.5 m (4.9 ft) tall and broad, it is a lax, thornless shrub. It prefers an open position in full sun. This cultivar has gained the Royal Horticultural Society's Award of Garden Merit.

Other cultivar names include 'Bengal Crimson' and Bengal Beauty.
