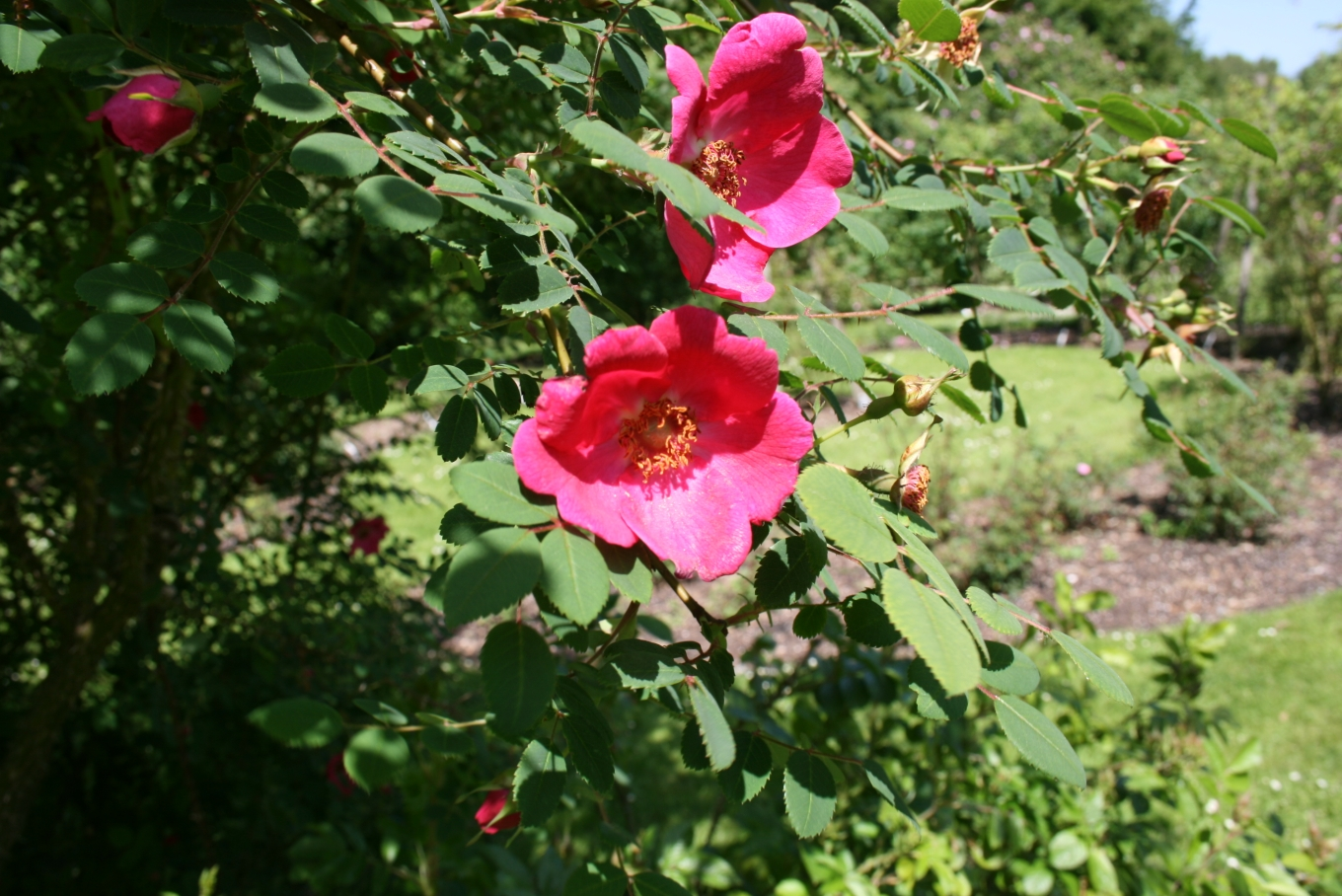

Scientific classification
- Kingdom: Plantae
- Clade: Tracheophytes
- Clade: Angiosperms
- Clade: Eudicots
- Clade: Rosids
- Order: Rosales
- Family: Rosaceae
- Genus: Rosa
- Species: R. moyesii

Binomial name
- Rosa moyesii Hemsl. & E.H.Wilson

Synonyms
- Rosa holodonta Stapf; Rosa moyesii var. fargesii Rolfe; Rosa moyesii var. pubescens T.T.Yu & H.T.Tsai; Rosa moyesii f. rosea Rehder & E.H.Wilson; Rosa roseomoyesii Almq.; Rosa stevensii Rehder; Rosa sweginzowii Koehne; Rosa sweginzowii var. glandulosa Cardot; Rosa sweginzowii var. inermis C.Marquand & Airy Shaw; Rosa sweginzowii var. stevensii (Rehder) T.C.Ku; Rosa wardii Mulligan; Rosa wardii var. culta Mulligan

= Rosa moyesii =

Species of flowering plant

Rosa moyesii is a species of flowering plant in the rose family Rosaceae. It is native to western China. Growing to 4 m (13 ft) tall by 3 m (10 ft) wide, it is a vigorous deciduous shrub, with plentiful matte green leaves and flat red or pink flowers, with yellow central stamens, in summer. These are followed in autumn by prominent bottle-shaped rose-hips.

Rosa moyesii is cultivated as an ornamental shrub and has been used in rose breeding. The more compact hybrid cultivar R. moyesii 'Geranium', with brilliant orange-scarlet blooms, has gained the Royal Horticultural Society's Award of Garden Merit.

== Gallery ==
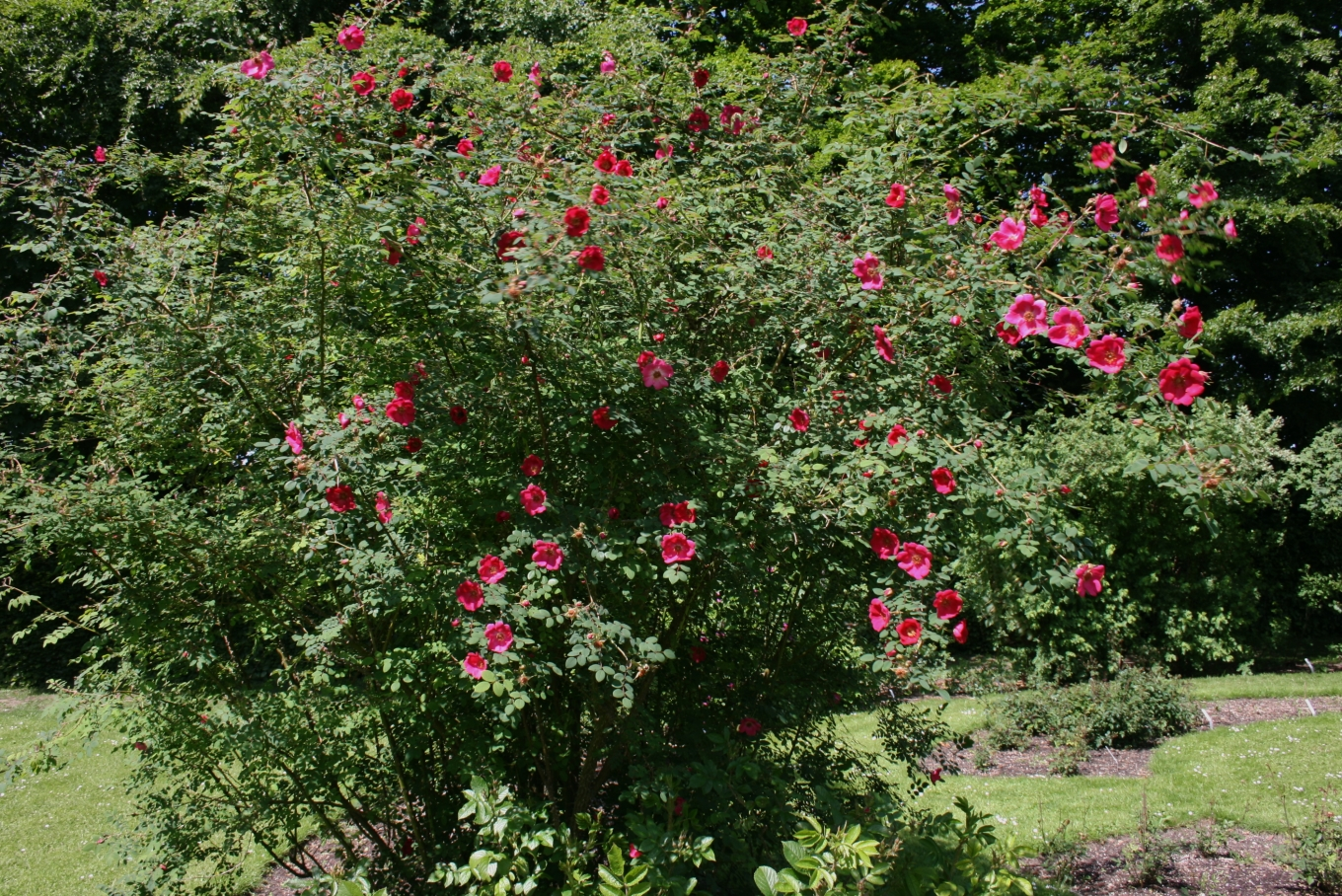
Growth habit

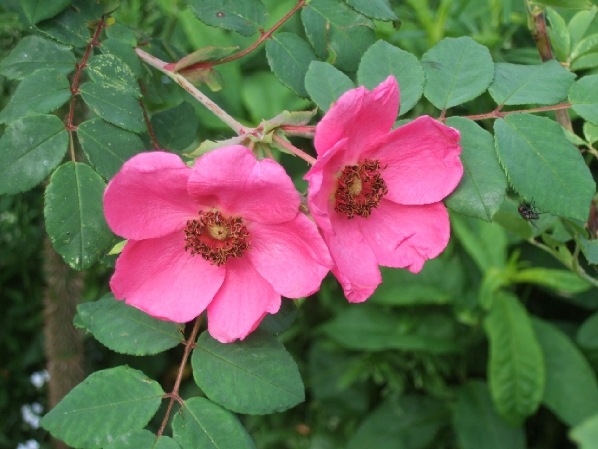
Flowers

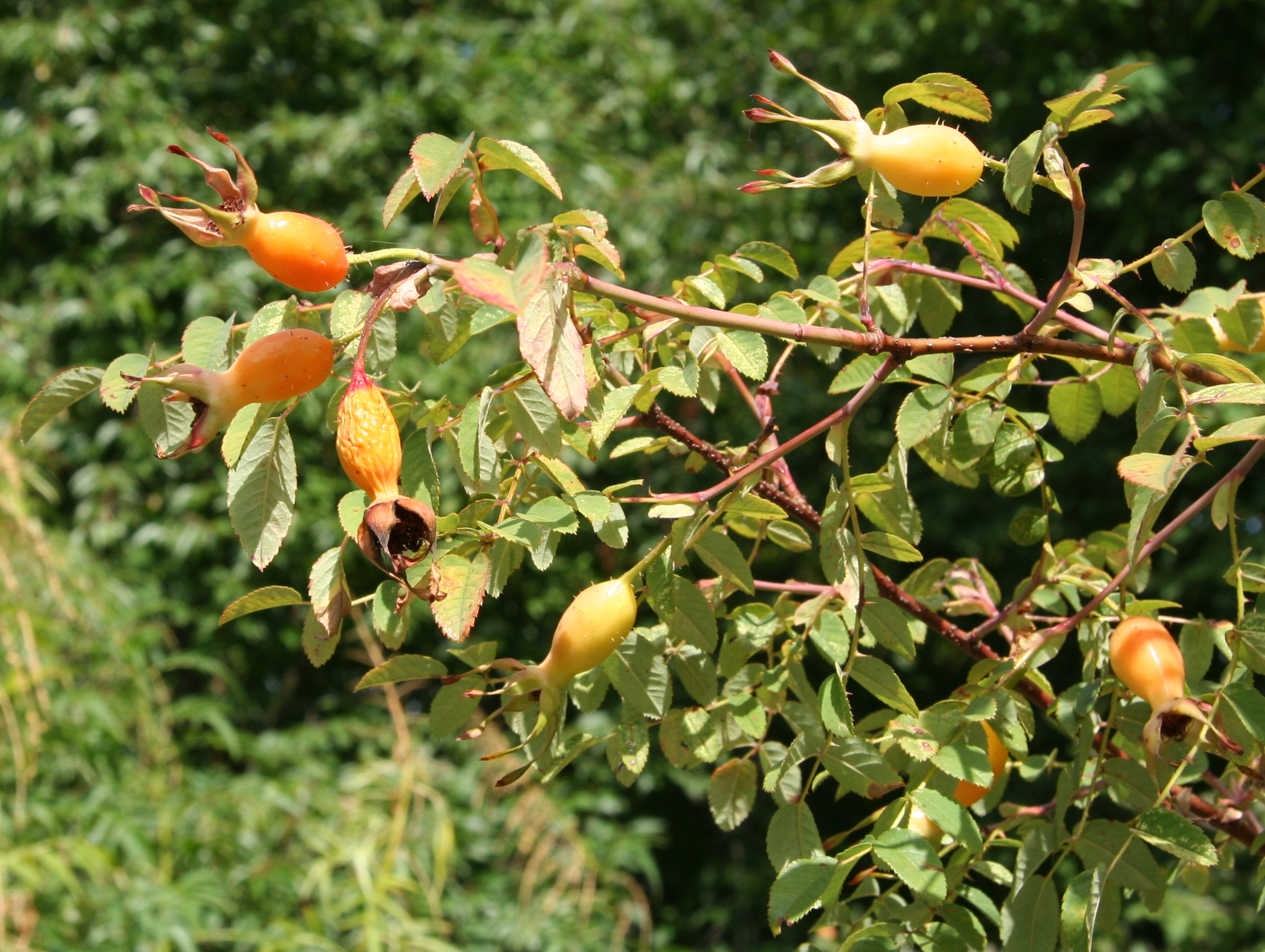
Fruits
