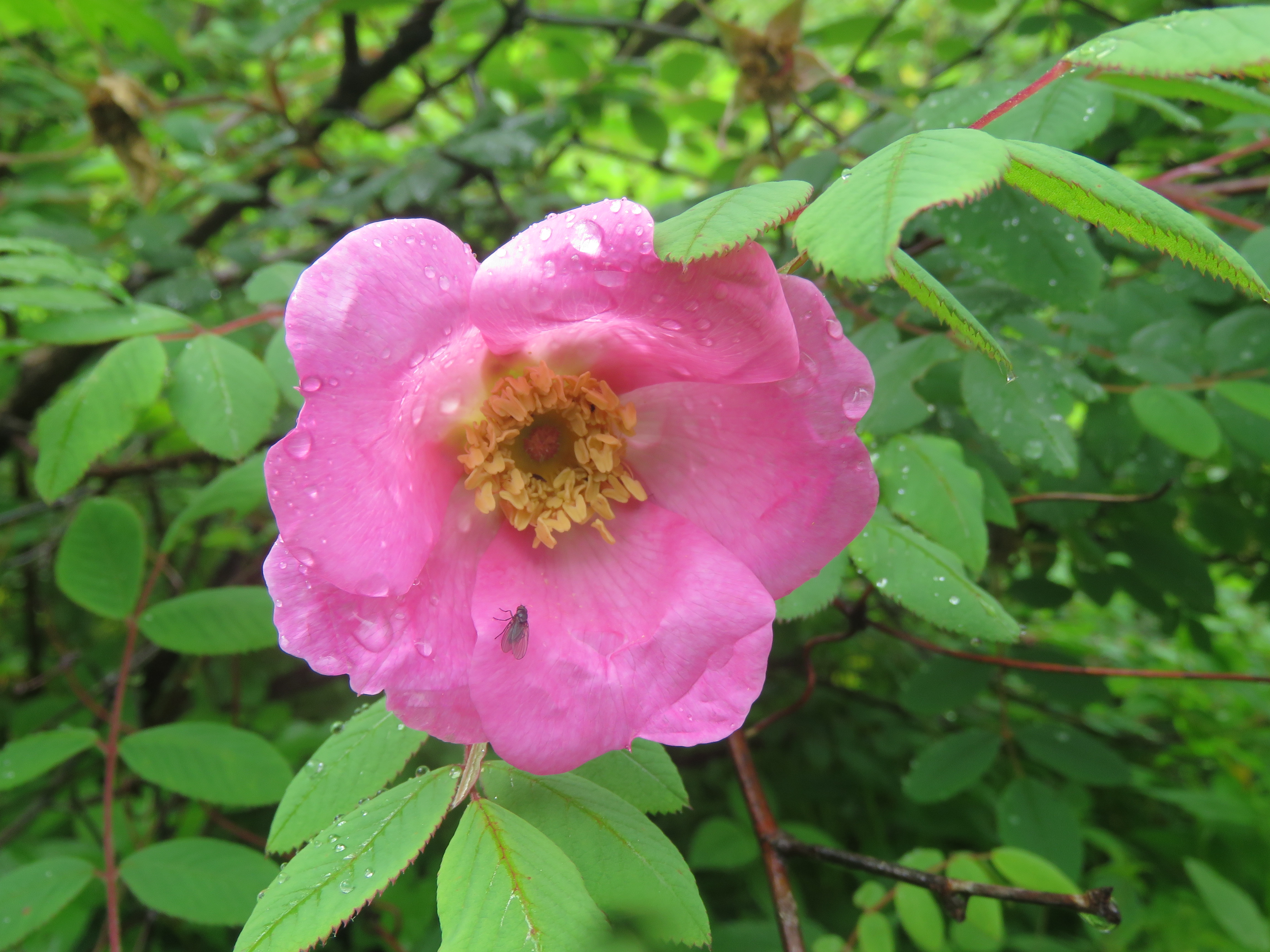
- Flower and leaves
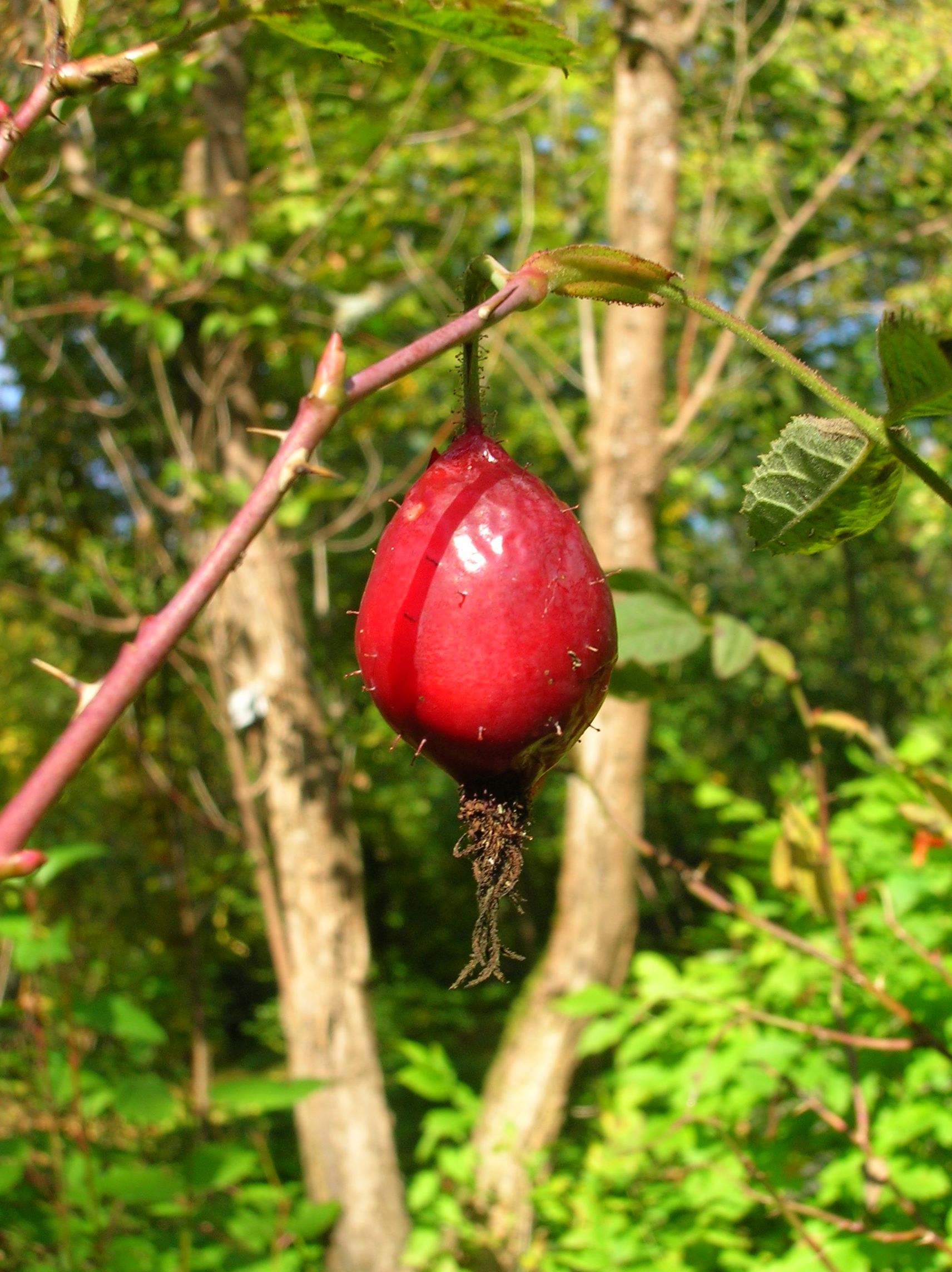
- Prickly hip

Scientific classification
- Kingdom: Plantae
- Clade: Tracheophytes
- Clade: Angiosperms
- Clade: Eudicots
- Clade: Rosids
- Order: Rosales
- Family: Rosaceae
- Genus: Rosa
- Species: R. macrophylla

Binomial name
- Rosa macrophylla Lindl.

Synonyms
- Rosa guilelmiwaldemarii Klotzsch; Rosa hoffmeisteri Klotzsch; Rosa rubeoides Andrews; Rosa torulosa Wall. ex Hook.f.

= Rosa macrophylla =

Species of plant in the rose family

Rosa macrophylla, the big-hip rose, is a species of flowering plant in the family Rosaceae, native to the Himalayan region. There are a number of cultivars, including 'Doncasteri', 'Glaucescens', 'Master Hugh', and 'Rubricaulis'. 'Master Hugh' has the largest hips of any readily available rose.

== Subtaxa ==
The following varieties are accepted:

- Rosa macrophylla var. glandulifera T.T.Yu & T.C.Ku – southern Tibet
- Rosa macrophylla var. macrophylla – entire range
