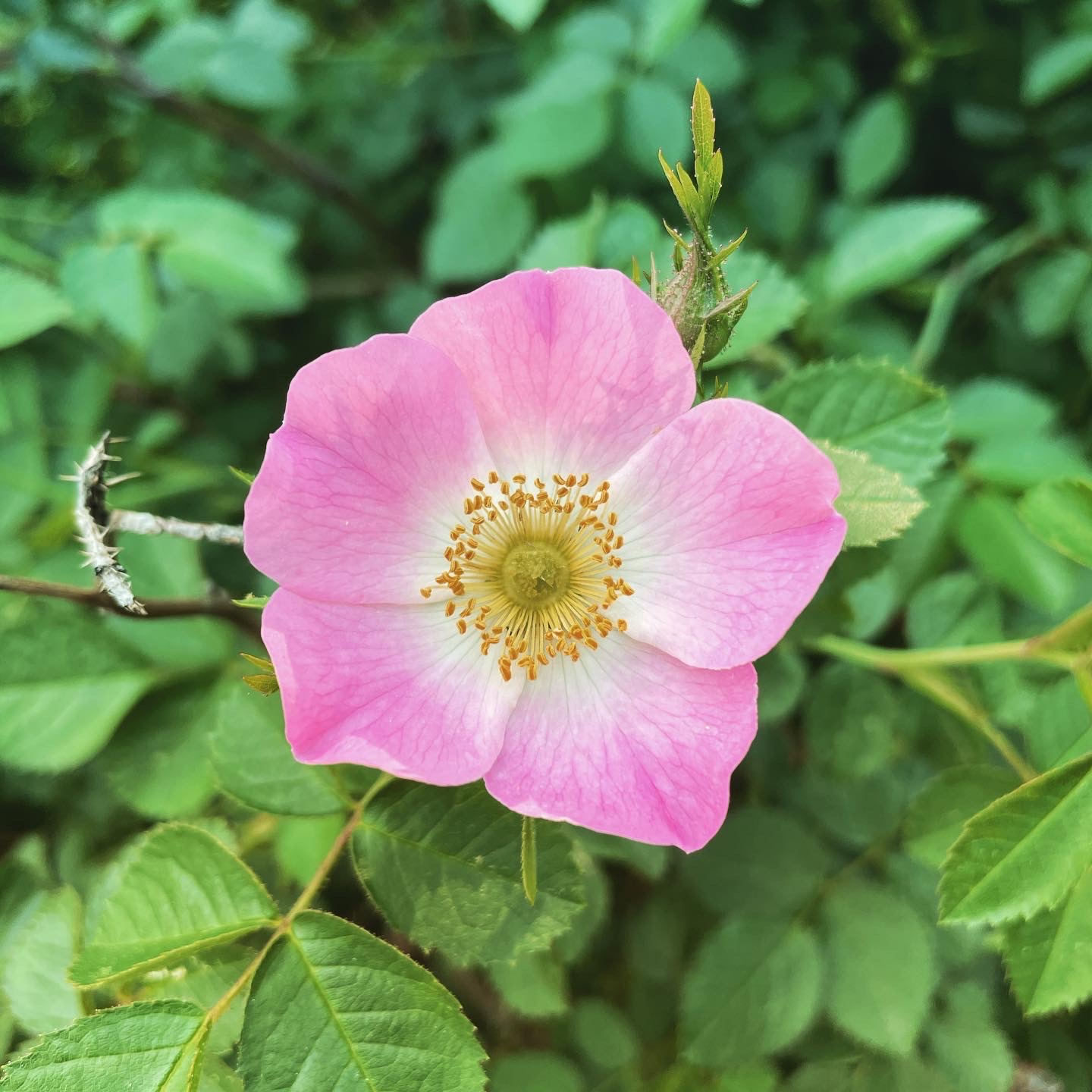
- Growing wild near Toronto

Conservation status
- Least Concern (IUCN 3.1)

Scientific classification
- Kingdom: Plantae
- Clade: Embryophytes
- Clade: Tracheophytes
- Clade: Spermatophytes
- Clade: Angiosperms
- Clade: Eudicots
- Clade: Rosids
- Order: Rosales
- Family: Rosaceae
- Genus: Rosa
- Species: R. rubiginosa

Binomial name
- Rosa rubiginosa L.

Synonyms
- List: Chabertia rotundifolia (A.Rau) Gand.; Chabertia rubiginosa (L.) Gand.; Chabertia umbellata (Leers) Gand.; Laggeria eglanteria (L.) Gand.; Rosa apricorum Ripart ex Déségl.; Rosa caloacantha Gand.; Rosa camberiensis Déségl.; Rosa canina var. sassnowskyana Regel; Rosa canina var. sepium Poir.; Rosa chailletii Déségl.; Rosa communis var. aciculata Ravaud ex Rouy; Rosa comosa Ripart; Rosa comosella Déségl. & Ozanon; Rosa densa Timb.-Lagr.; Rosa dimorphacantha A.Martinis; Rosa dolorosa Déségl. & Ozanon; Rosa drosophora Heinr.Braun; Rosa × dumetorum var. klukii (Besser) Schmalh.; Rosa echinocarpa Ripart ex Déségl.; Rosa eglanteria L. nom. utique rej.; Rosa elliptica var. klukii (Besser) R.Keller; Rosa elliptica f. klukii (Besser) R.Keller ex Fiori; Rosa graveolens var. klukii (Besser) Heinr.Braun; Rosa gremlii (Christ) Gremli; Rosa jenensis M.Schulze; Rosa klukii Besser; Rosa kurganica N.V.Mironova; Rosa lemanii var. pimpinelloides (G.Mey.) Gremli; Rosa lemanii var. rotundifolia (A.Rau) Gremli; Rosa lutea var. eglanteria (L.) Aiton; Rosa micrantha var. eriophora C.Vicioso; Rosa micrantha var. gremlii (Christ) Heinr.Braun; Rosa micrantha var. pallidiflora Heinr.Braun; Rosa minuscula Ozanon & Gillot; Rosa moutinii Crép.; Rosa ostryifolia Gand.; Rosa resinosa (Wallr.) Lej.; Rosa rotundifolia (A.Rau) Tratt.; Rosa rubiginella Heinr.Braun; Rosa rugibinosa Steven; Rosa sassnowskyana (Regel) Musch.; Rosa sepium var. klukii (Besser) Rapin; Rosa spinourceolata Crép.; Rosa suaveolens Pursh; Rosa suavifolia Lightf.; Rosa sylvicola Déségl. & Ripart; Rosa tanaitica N.V.Mironova; Rosa uliginosa Gilib. opus utique oppr.; Rosa umbellata Leers; Rosa vaillantiana (Thory) Chabert; Rosa viscaria var. apricorum (Ripart ex Déségl.) Rouy & E.G.Camus; Rosa viscaria var. comosa (Ripart) Rouy & E.G.Camus; Rosa viscaria var. comosella (Déségl. & Ozanon) Rouy & E.G.Camus; Rosa viscaria var. densa (Timb.-Lagr.) Rouy & E.G.Camus; Rosa viscaria var. dimorphophylla Rouy & E.G.Camus; Rosa viscaria var. dolorosa (Déségl. & Ozanon) Rouy & E.G.Camus; Rosa viscaria var. echinocarpa (Ripart ex Déségl.) Rouy & E.G.Camus; Rosa viscaria var. isacantha (Borbás) Rouy & E.G.Camus; Rosa viscaria var. mirabilis (H.J.Coste) Rouy & E.G.Camus; Rosa viscaria var. parvifolia Rouy & E.G.Camus; Rosa viscaria var. parvifolia (A.Rau) Rouy & E.G.Camus; Rosa viscaria var. prunieriana (Moutin) Rouy & E.G.Camus; Rosa viscaria var. pseudocomosa Rouy & E.G.Camus; Rosa viscaria var. rotundifolia (A.Rau) Rouy & E.G.Camus; Rosa viscaria var. setocarpa (Borbás & Holuby) Rouy & E.G.Camus; Rosa viscaria var. stenocarpa Rouy & E.G.Camus; Rosa walpoleana Greene; Rosa zamensis Simonk. & Heinr.Braun

= Rosa rubiginosa =

Species of flowering plant

Rosa rubiginosa (sweet briar, sweetbriar rose, sweet brier or eglantine; syn. R. eglanteria) is a species of rose native to Europe and western Asia.

== Description ==
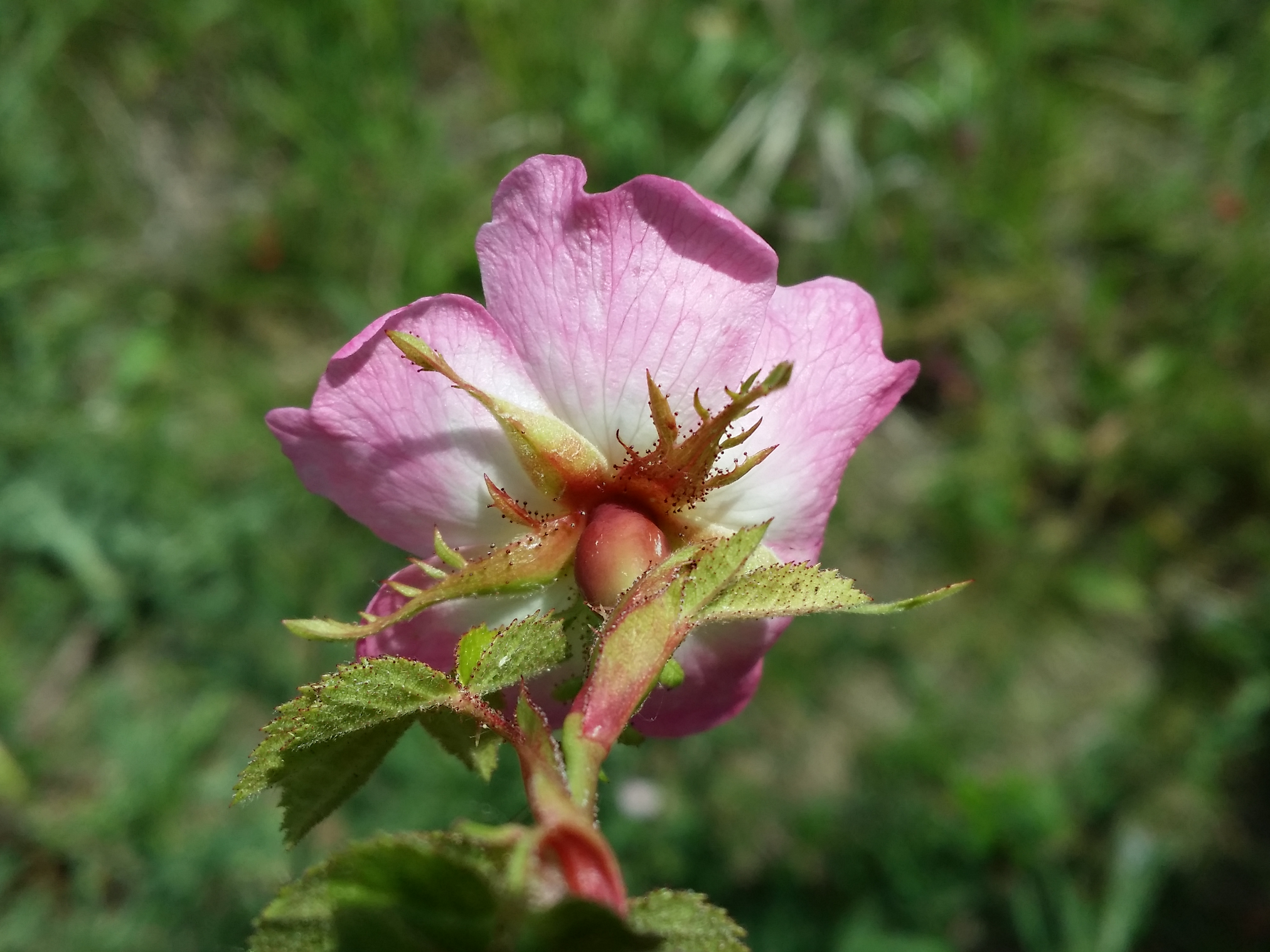
Rosa rubiginosa sepals, prickles, glandular hairs

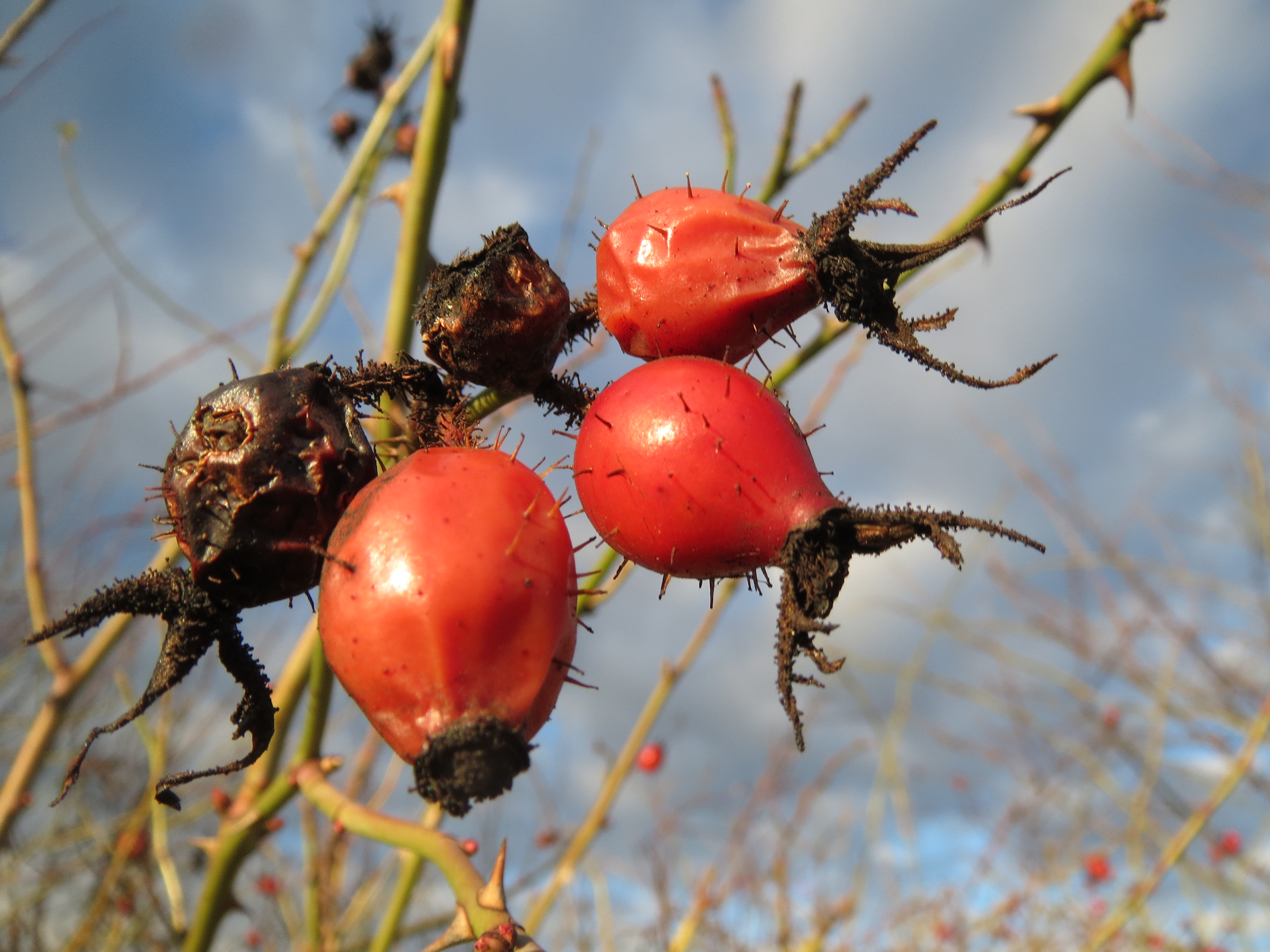
Ripe fruits (called "hips")

It is a dense deciduous shrub 2–3 meters (6.6–9.8 ft) high and across, with the stems bearing numerously hooked prickles. The foliage has a strong apple-like fragrance. The leaves are pinnately compound, 5–9 cm (2.0–3.5 in) long, with 5–9 rounded to oval leaflets with a serrated margin, and numerous glandular hairs. The flowers are 1.8–3 cm in diameter, the five petals being pink with a white base, and the numerous stamens yellow; the flowers are produced in clusters of 2–7 together, from late spring to mid-summer. The fruit is a globose to oblong red hip 1–2 cm in diameter.

== Etymology ==
Its name eglantine is from Middle English eglentyn, from Old French aiglantin (adj.), from aiglent 'sweetbrier', from Vulgar Latin *aculentus (with the ending of spinulentus 'thorny, prickly'), from Latin aculeus 'prickle', from acus 'needle'. Sweet refers to the sweet, apple fragrance of the leaves, while briar ~ brier refers to it being a thorny bush.

== Distribution and habitat ==
Rosa rubiginosa is native to most of Europe with the exception of the extreme north (above 61°N), where it inhabits pastures and thorny bushes from the montane to the subalpine floor, with a sunny, continental climate. It is somewhat rare, with isolated specimens near roads and pastures frequented by cattle. Its presence is doubtful in western Asia. In Southern Europe it lives in higher altitudes, usually 1,000 to 1,700 m (3,300 to 5,600 ft). In Portugal it is classified as Critically Endangered and is restricted to the Serra da Estrela range.

== Cultivation and uses ==
In addition to its pink flowers, it is valued for its scent and the hips that form after the flowers and persist well into the winter.

During World War II, the British relied on rose hips and hops as presumed sources of vitamins A and C, leading to the British wartime expression: "We are getting by on our hips and hops."

== Invasive species ==
Rosa rubiginosa has become an invasive species in most of Argentine Patagonia and in the south of Chile, particularly where the steppe meets the forest. Cattle spread the seed efficiently through their feces. Poor knowledge of how detrimental it is to the local economy and native species has led Rosa rubiginosa to become an existing invasive threat, causing several millions of dollars' worth of damage each year. It is an invasive species in southeast Australia, and is classified as a restricted plant in New Zealand banned from sale, propagation and distribution in the Auckland, Canterbury, and Southland regions. The New Zealand Department of Conservation classifies R. rubiginosa as an "environmental weed". The plant is present in extensive areas of pasture and tussock grasslands in the Otago and Canterbury regions, where the seeds are spread by cattle, possums and birds that eat the hips. Growth from seed is aided by the reduction in competing pasture by rabbits. It is listed as a Category 1 Declared Weed in South Africa. These plants may no longer be planted or propagated, and all trade in their seeds, cuttings or other propagative material is prohibited.
