= Rose hip =

Fruit of the rose plant

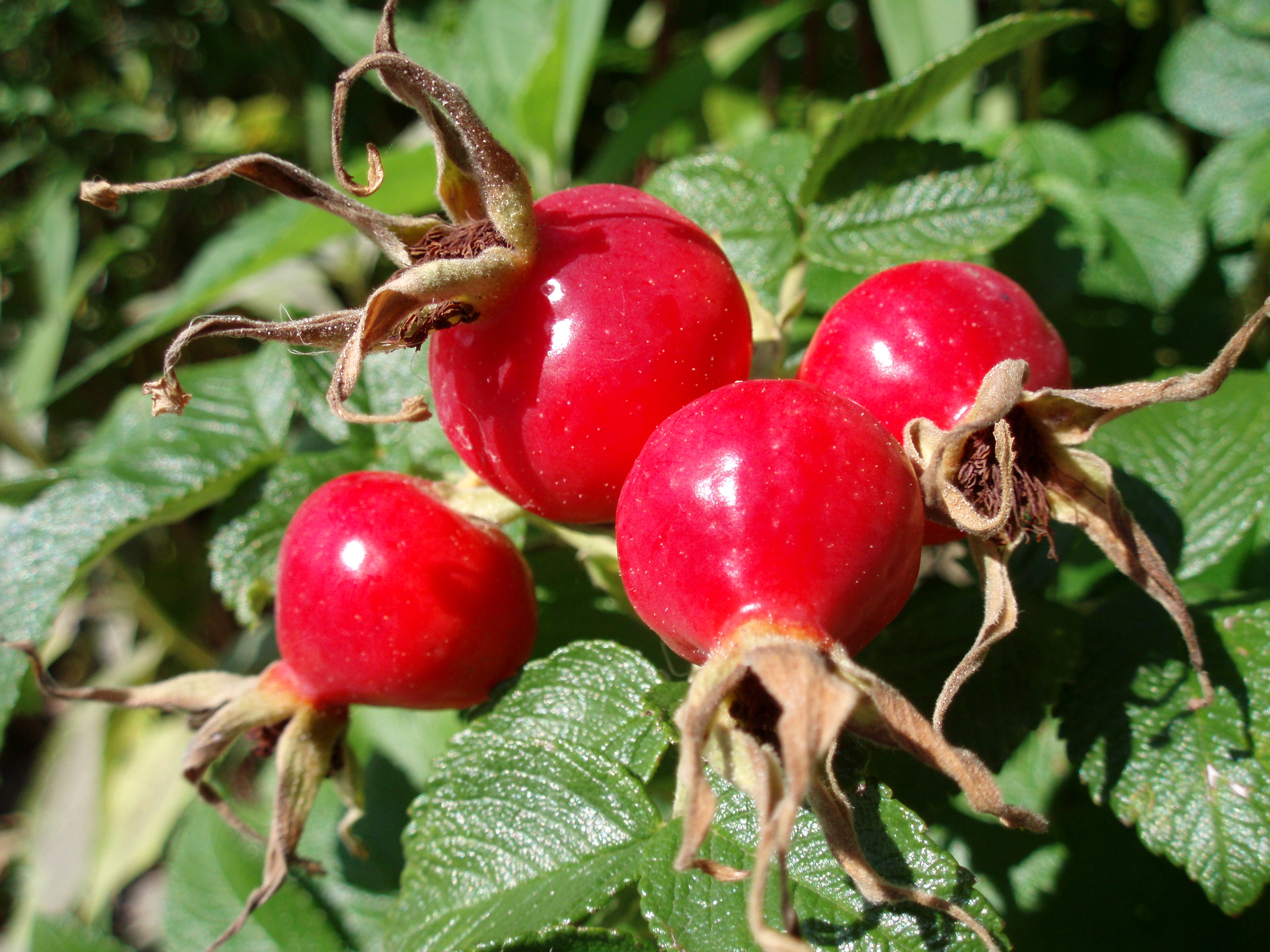
Rose hips from Rosa rugosa (beach rose)

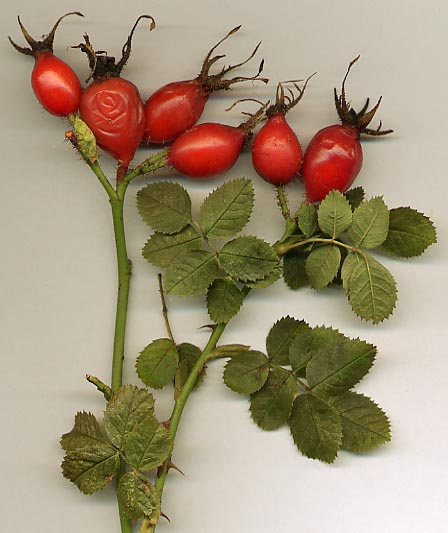
Sweet-briar ssp. complete with persistent sepals at the end of the fully ripened hip, backward pointing thorns and hairs covering the pedicels and fruiting body.

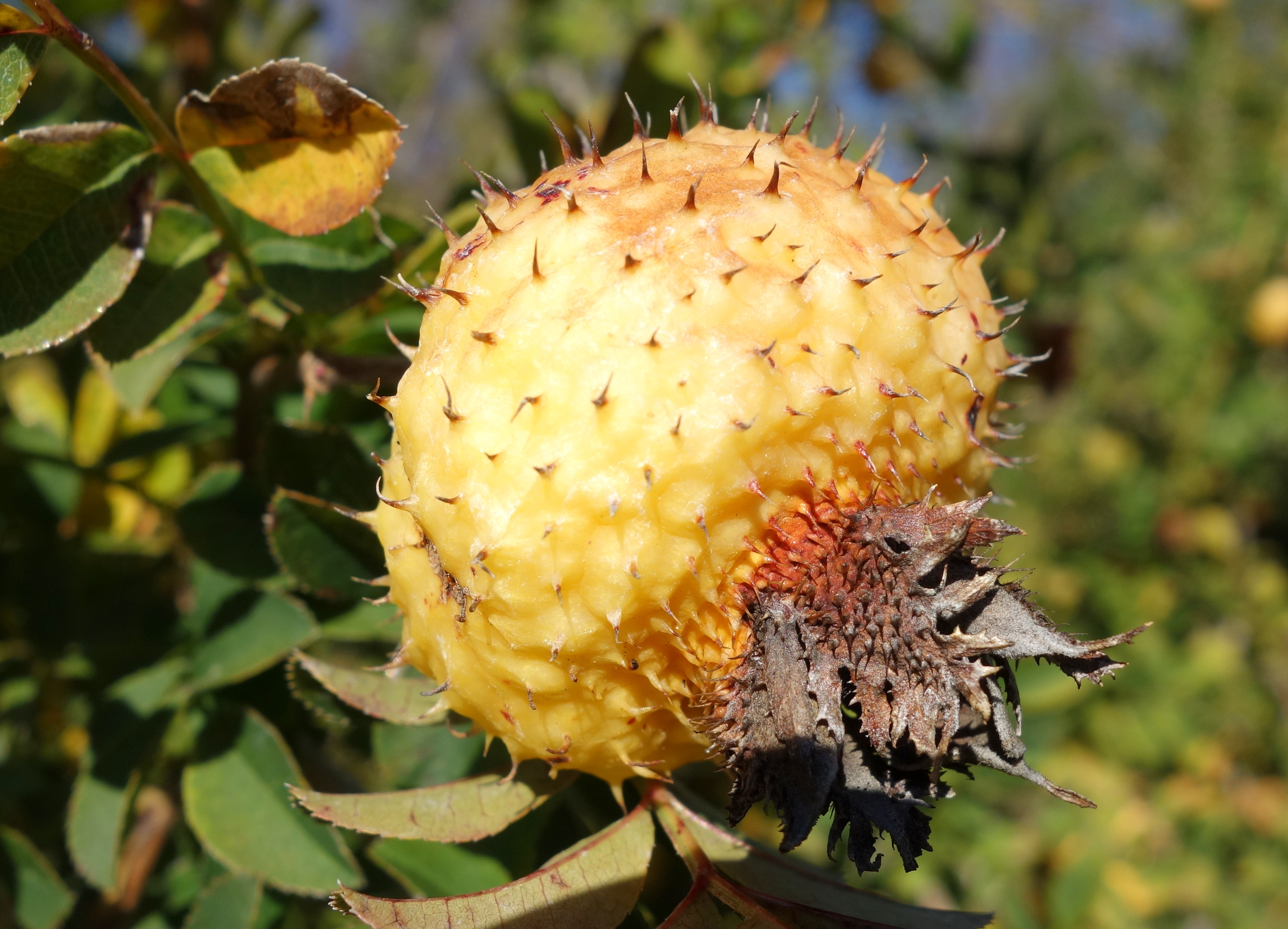
Rose hips from Rosa roxburghii in Quarryhill Botanical Garden, California

The rose hip or rosehip, also called rose haw and rose hep, is the accessory fruit of the various species of rose plant. It is typically red to orange, but ranges from dark purple to black in some species. Rose hips begin to form after pollination of flowers in spring or early summer, and ripen in late summer through autumn.

== Propagation ==
Roses are propagated from rose hips by removing the achenes that contain the seeds from the hypanthium (the outer coating) and sowing just beneath the surface of the soil. The seeds can take up to a year to germinate. Most species require chilling (stratification), with some, such as Rosa canina, only germinating after two winter chill periods.

== Uses ==
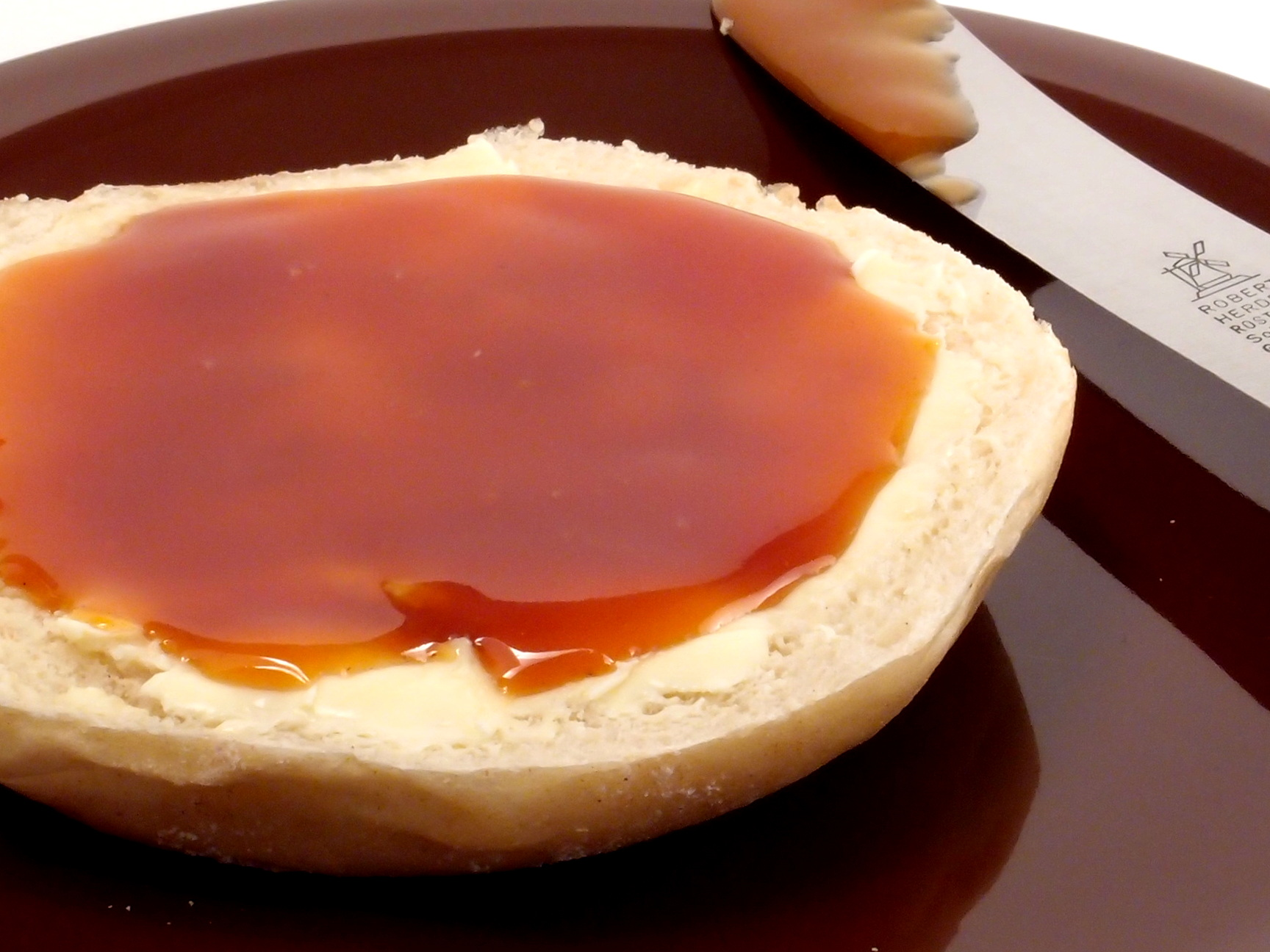
Rose hip jam on a bread roll

Rose hips are used in bread and pies, jam, jelly, marmalade, syrup, soup, tea, wine, and other beverages.

Rose hips can be eaten raw, like berries, if care is taken to avoid the hairs inside the fruit. These urticating hairs are used as itching powder. It is often recommended to harvest rose hips after a first frost has softened the fruits for a sweeter flavor.

A few rose species are grown for the ornamental value of their hips, such as Rosa moyesii, which has prominent, large, red bottle-shaped fruits. Rosa macrophylla 'Master Hugh' has the largest hips of any readily available rose.

Rose hips are commonly used in herbal tea, often blended with hibiscus. An oil is also extracted from the seeds. Rose hip soup, known as nyponsoppa in Swedish, is consumed in Sweden. Rhodomel, a type of mead, is made with rose hips.

Rose hips can be used to make pálinka, a traditional fruit brandy in Hungary, Romania, and other countries sharing Austro-Hungarian history. Rose hips are also the central ingredient of cockta, the fruity-tasting national soft drink of Slovenia.

Dried rose hips are also sold for crafts and home fragrance purposes. The Inupiat mix rose hips with wild redcurrant and highbush cranberries and boil them into a syrup.

== Nutrients and research ==
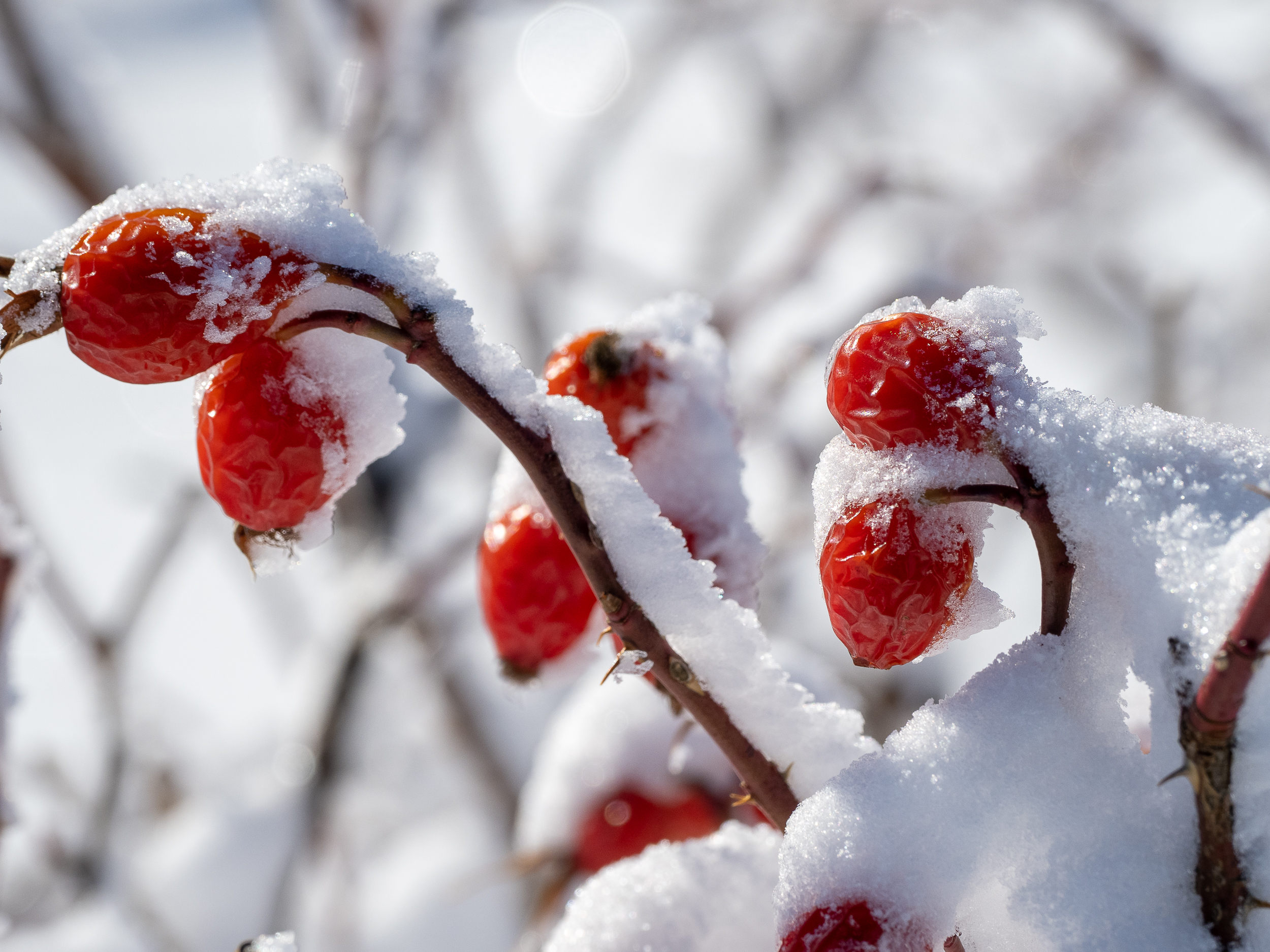
Rose hips under the snow

Wild rose hip fruits are particularly rich in vitamin C, containing 426 mg per 100 g or 0.4% by weight (w/w). RP-HPLC Assays of fresh rose hips and several commercially available products revealed a wide range of L-ascorbic acid (vitamin C) content, ranging from 0.03 to 1.3%.

Rose hips contain the carotenoids beta-carotene, lutein, zeaxanthin, and lycopene. A meta-analysis of human studies examining the potential for rose hip extracts to reduce arthritis pain concluded there was a small effect requiring further analysis of safety and efficacy in clinical trials. Use of rose hips is not considered an effective treatment for knee osteoarthritis.

== See also ==
- Rose hip seed oil
- Rosa moschata
- Rosa rubiginosa
- Rosa gymnocarpa
- Rosa roxburghii
