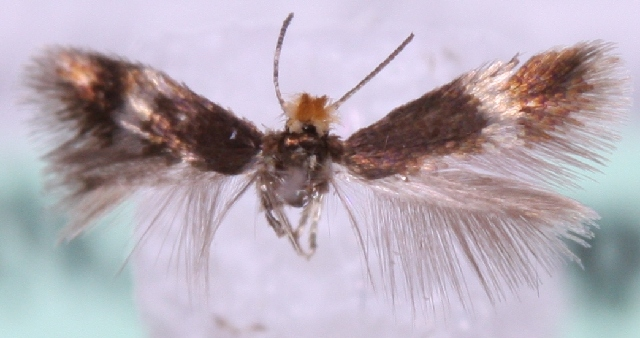

Scientific classification
- Kingdom: Animalia
- Phylum: Arthropoda
- Class: Insecta
- Order: Lepidoptera
- Family: Nepticulidae
- Genus: Stigmella
- Species: S. centifoliella

Binomial name
- Stigmella centifoliella (Zeller, 1848)

Synonyms
- Nepticula centifoliella Zeller, 1848; Nepticula hodgkinsoni Stainton, 1884

= Stigmella centifoliella =

Species of moth

Stigmella centifoliella is a moth of the family Nepticulidae. It is found from Scandinavia to the Iberian Peninsula, Italy, Albania and Greece, and from Great Britain to Ukraine. It is also present in North Africa.

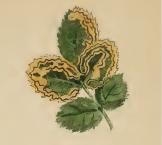
Mined rose leaf

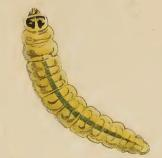
Larva

The wingspan is 4–6 mm.A small bronze-coloured moth. The antennae are filamentous, dark about half as long as the forewing. The innermost, greatly expanded joint is white. The head is yellow-haired, the body dark, but with a narrow, white collar at the "neck". The forewings are dark bronze-coloured, slightly off-centre with a rather broad, silvery-white to yellowish-white transverse band. The hind wing is narrow, grey, with long fringes. Meyrick- The head is ferruginous-orange, collar light yellowish. Antennal eyecaps ochreous-whitish. Forewings rather dark fuscous, slightly tinged with bronze or purple; a shining whitish fascia beyond middle; apical area beyond this more purple-tinged. Hindwings grey.

Adults are on wing from July to October.

The larvae feed on Rosa acicularis, Rosa × bifera, Rosa canina, Rosa centifolia, Rosa glauca, Rosa 'Hybrida', Rosa jundzillii, Rosa majalis, Rosa multiflora, Rosa pendulina, Rosa phoenicea, Rosa pimpinellifolia, Rosa rubiginosa, Rosa soulieana, Rosa tomentosa, Rosa wichurana, Sanguisorba hybrida, Sanguisorba minor and Sanguisorba officinalis. Larvae have also been reared from Alchemilla species. They mine the leaves of their host plant. Unlike the mines of Stigmella anomalella, this species' meandering mines rarely run along the outer edge of the leaves. The species probably has two generations each year.
