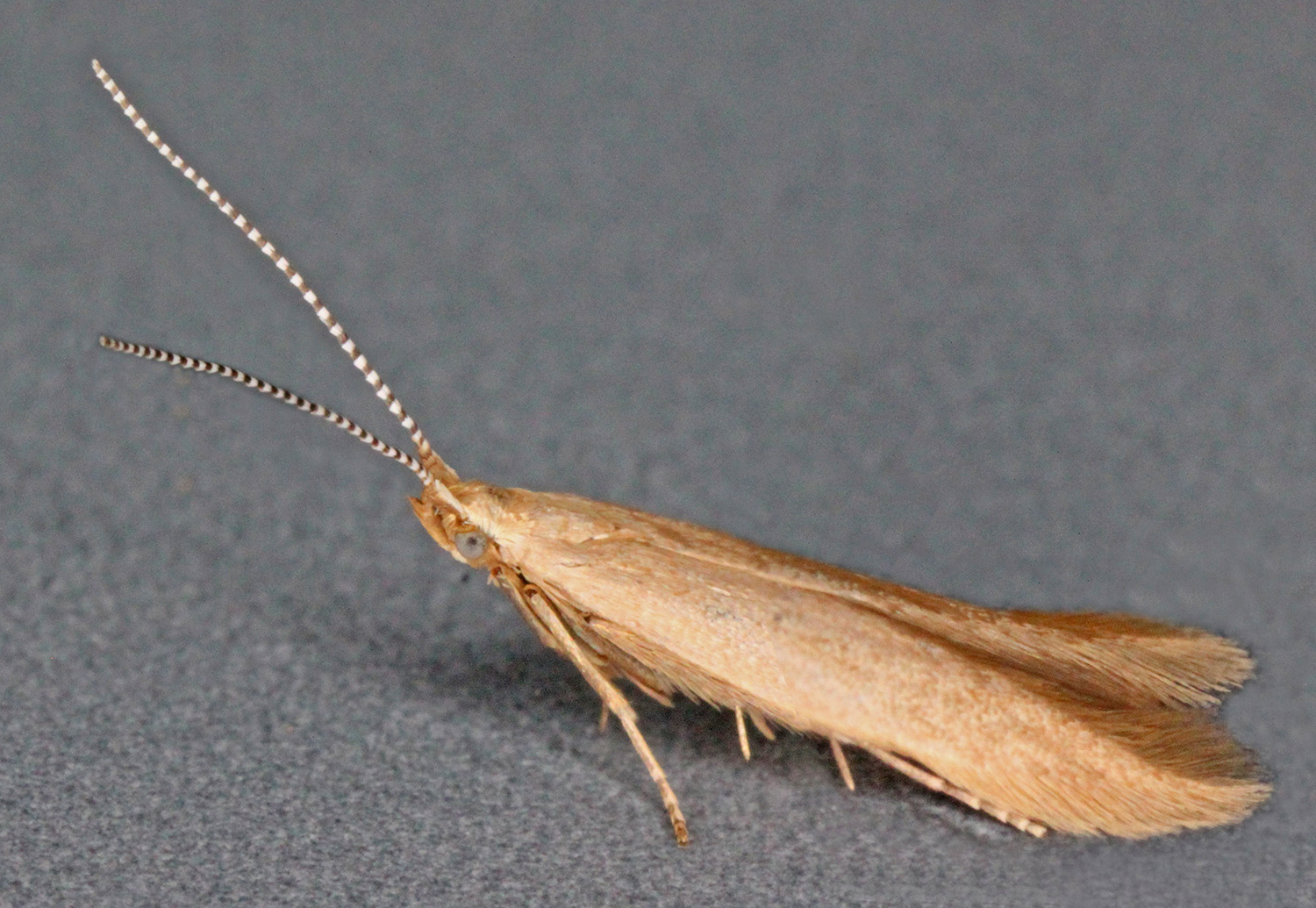
- Coleophora gryphipennella,Morfa Bychan, North Wales
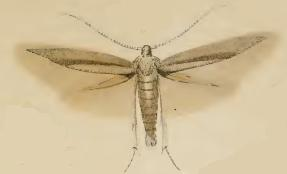

Scientific classification
- Kingdom: Animalia
- Phylum: Arthropoda
- Class: Insecta
- Order: Lepidoptera
- Family: Coleophoridae
- Genus: Coleophora
- Species: C. gryphipennella

Binomial name
- Coleophora gryphipennella (Hübner, 1796)

Synonyms
- Tinea gryphipennella Hübner, 1796

= Coleophora gryphipennella =

Species of moth

Coleophora gryphipennella is a moth of the family Coleophoridae. It is found in most of Europe, from Fennoscandia to the Iberian Peninsula and Italy and from Ireland to the Black Sea.

The wingspan is 11–13 mm (0.43–0.51 in). Head whitish-ochreous or greyish-ochreous. Antennae white, ringed with dark fuscous, basal joint whitish-ochreous. Forewings greyish ochreous, in female more ochreous. Hindwings rather dark grey.

The moth flies from June to July depending on the location.

The larvae feed on rose species, including Rosa acicularis, Rosa arkansana, Rosa canina, Rosa glauca, Rosa pendulina, Rosa pimpinellifolia, Rosa rubiginosa, Rosa seraphini, Rosa soulieana and Rosa tomentosa. It has also been recorded on wild strawberry, Fragaria vesca.

== Gallery ==
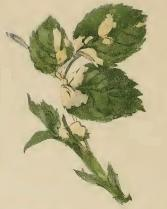
Mined rose leaf with a case attached.

Larva.

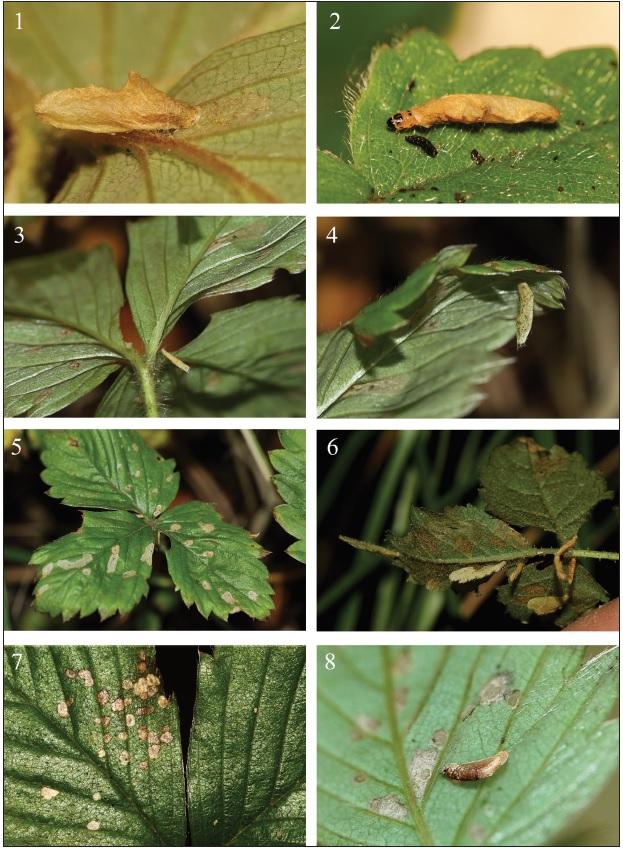
Figures 1–8. 1. Spatulate case found on Fragaria 20.v.2011. To the right of the case feeding damage can be seen. 2. Spatulate case found on Fragaria 20.v.2011, with larva. 3. First stage case on Fragaria, showing also the place where the leaf was cut for a second stage case, 02.x.2012. 4. Spatulate case on Fragaria, 02.x.2012. 5. Fragaria leaf from Figure 3 showing feeding damage, first stage case and 'leaf cut', 02.x.2012. 6. First stage cases and spatulate cases on Rosa, 02.x.2012. 7. Tiny fleck mines on Fragaria, 29.x.2013. 8. Small pistol case on Fragaria.

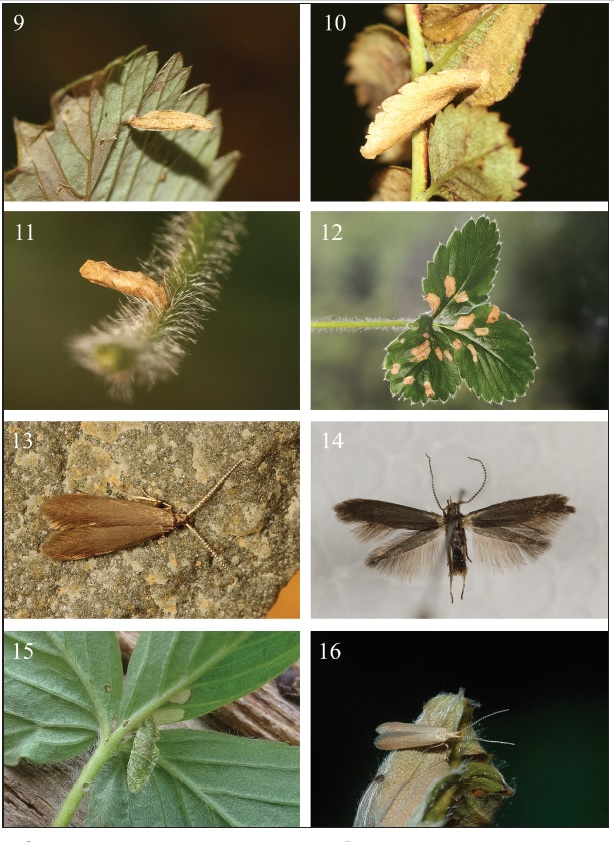
Figures 9–16. 9. Spatulate leaf case on Fragaria collected for DNA analysis, 29.x.2013. 10. Spatulate leaf case on Rosa collected for DNA analysis, 29.x.2013. 11. Final, trivalved case of the reared larva after hibernation and after feeding ended on 05.v.2014. 12. Fleck mines produced by the reared larva after hibernation and after feeding ended on 05.v.2014. 13. Emerged imago Coleophora gryphipennella reared from a hibernating larva. 14. Emerged imago Coleophora gryphipennella reared from a hibernating larva. 15. Fresh green case on Fragaria, 07.v.2014, leg. and photograph Luc Knijnsberg. 16. Emerged imago from the case found on 07.v.2014.
