= Arboretum Marcel Kroenlein =

Arboretum in Provence-Alpes-Côte d'Azur, France

Coordinates: 44°05′46″N 7°05′18″E

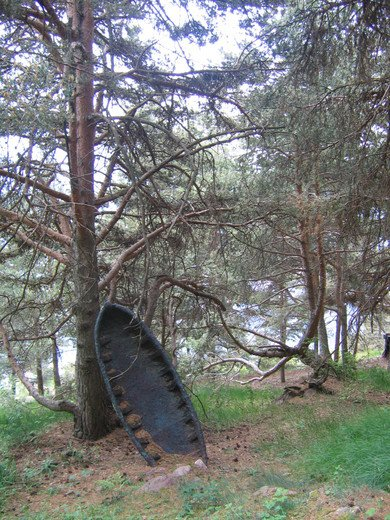
Artwork in the Arboretum Marcel Kroenlein

The Arboretum Marcel Kroenlein, also known as the Arboretum de Roure, is a high-altitude arboretum situated 1,270 to 1,700 metres (4,170–5,580 ft) above sea level. It covers 15 hectares (37 acres) on the edge of the Mercantour National Park in Roure, Alpes-Maritimes, Provence-Alpes-Côte d'Azur, France. It is open daily.

The arboretum was conceived in 1987 when Michèle Ramin, now the arboretum's president, met Marcel Kroenlein, then director of the Jardin Exotique de Monaco. Its first trees were planted in 1988, and in 1989 artists began to display their artwork on the site. Featured artists have included Arman, Folon, Ben, and César. Every year the arboretum organizes an exhibition sponsored by a contemporary artist; examples include: Andy Goldsworthy and Ousmane Sow.

The arboretum's mission is to collect hardwoods and conifers from the Alps and every mountainous region across the world, and to preserve the natural flora of the Alpes-Maritimes. The site features a variety of micro-climates, due to its Alpine and Mediterranean location and its varied topography. As such, it is host to a wide variety of natural vegetation. Indigenous foliage is primarily pine and European larch.

Since the arboretum's creation, more than 400 additional tree species, including 137 exotic species, have been planted at the site. Its collection of conifers includes the Wollemi pine and Pinus culminicola, as well as varieties of cedar, fir, juniper, larch, and spruce. It also contains a collection of high-altitude maples from the Americas, Asia, and Europe, along with ash trees, ginkgo, red oak, prunus, walnut, and Sequoiadendron giganteum.

Endemic to the Maritime Alps but now rare locally, Viola valderia, the mountain pansy, has been discovered growing on the site. The arboretum has now dedicated part of its site to preservation of local wildflowers. It has a collection of rare and endangered wild Rosa spp. of the Maritime Alps. Alpine wild roses of the region include: Rosa agrestis, R. arvensis, R. glauca, R. pendulina, R. montana, and R. villosa. The French rose, R. gallica, grows wild on the site and is a protected species in France.

== See also ==
- List of botanical gardens in France
