= André Soulié =

French Roman Catholic missionary

The Reverend Jean-André Soulié MEP
- Priest
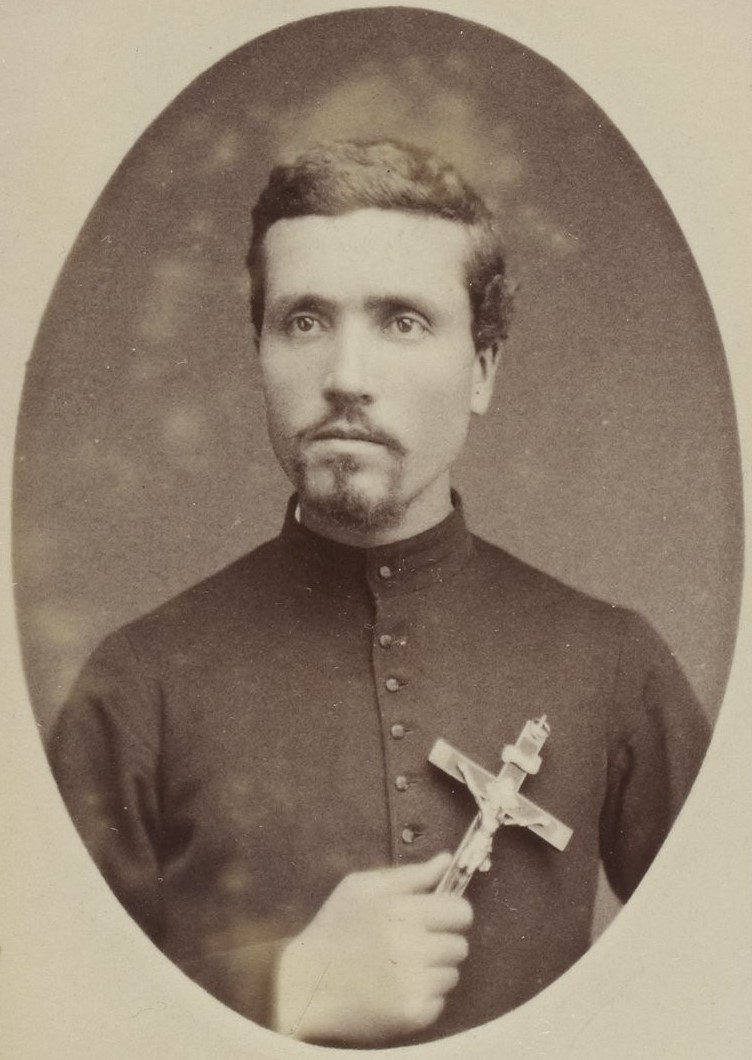
- Church: Catholic Church
- Diocese: Apostolic Vicariate of Thibet
- Installed: 1886
- Term ended: 1905

Orders
- Ordination: 5 July 1885

Personal details
- Born: 6 October 1858 Saint-Juéry, Aveyron, France
- Died: 11 December 1905 (aged 47) Ngarongchy valley, near Yaregong, Batang, Sichuan, China
- Denomination: Catholic
- Occupation: Missionary

Jean-André Soulié, MEP (6 October 1858 – 11 December 1905, known in Chinese sources as 蘇烈 [Su Lie]) was a French Catholic missionary sent to East Tibet of Qing China. He was killed in a 1905 anti-Catholic revolt. He was a member of the Paris Foreign Missions Society.

== Biography ==
Soulié was born in Saint-Juéry, Aveyron, on 6 October 1858. He was ordained on 5 July 1885, for the Paris Foreign Missions Society and sent in October 1885 to the Apostolic Vicariate of Thibet (now Diocese of Kangding), administered by Mgr Félix Biet. His first mission was to Batang, then at Cha-pa (now Shaba, close to Kanding). He met with his colleagues the French expedition of Gabriel Bonvalot and Prince Henri of Orléans in June 1890 at Ta-tsien-lu (now Kangding). In 1896, he was sent to the mission station of Tse-ku (close to now Yanmen) with Father Jules Dubernard. This village is situated on the right bank of the Lancang (upper Mekong) river. Afterwards, he moved to Yaregong (now Yarigong Town) where he gained some popularity by practicing medicine among local people.

== Death ==
Soulié was captured, tortured, and shot in the Ngarongchy valley, not far from Yaregong, Sichuan, by lamas during the 1905 Tibetan Revolt.

== Legacy ==
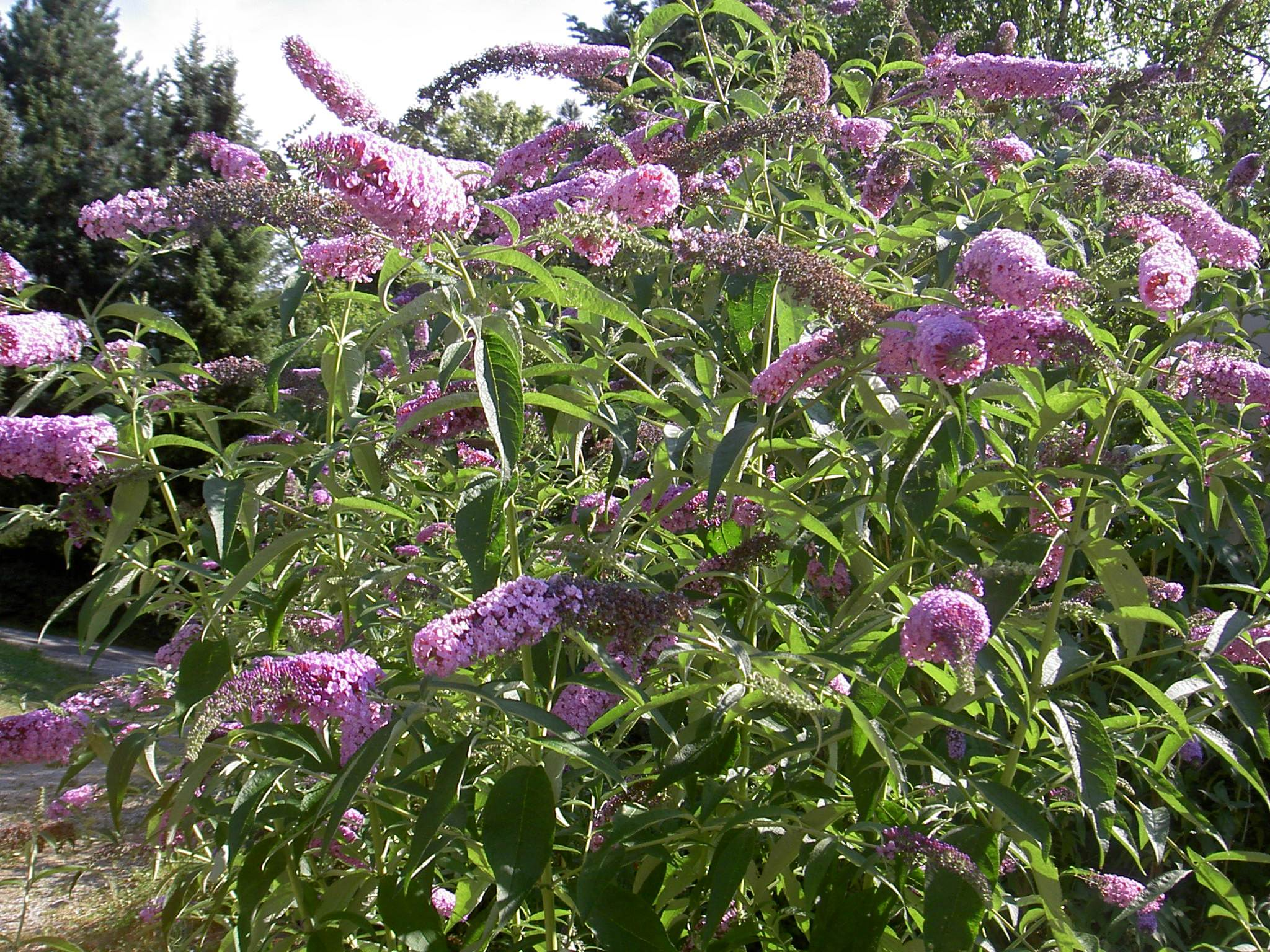
Buddleja davidii bush

As a botanist, Father Soulié collected more than 7,000 species, among them Rosa soulieana, a species of endemic Rosa, which was introduced in Europe by Auguste Louis Maurice de Vilmorin, and studied by Museum d'histoire naturelle in Paris, and then by François Crépin in 1896. Most of Father Soulié's specimens were studied and defined by Adrien Franchet. The laughingthrush species streaked barwing (Actinodura souliei) is also named after him.

Father Soulié also sent the first seeds of Buddleja davidii to Paris in 1895. This decorative shrub was then introduced by Vilmorin and widely distributed in Europe after 1916.

Around Tsekou and Atentsé (now Yunling), he captured and sent to the French Natural History Museum the first specimens known to science of the Black snub-nosed monkey, Rhinopithecus bieti, described by Alphonse Milne-Edwards in 1897.

== See also ==
- Théodore Monbeig
- Catholic Church in Sichuan
- Catholic Church in Tibet
