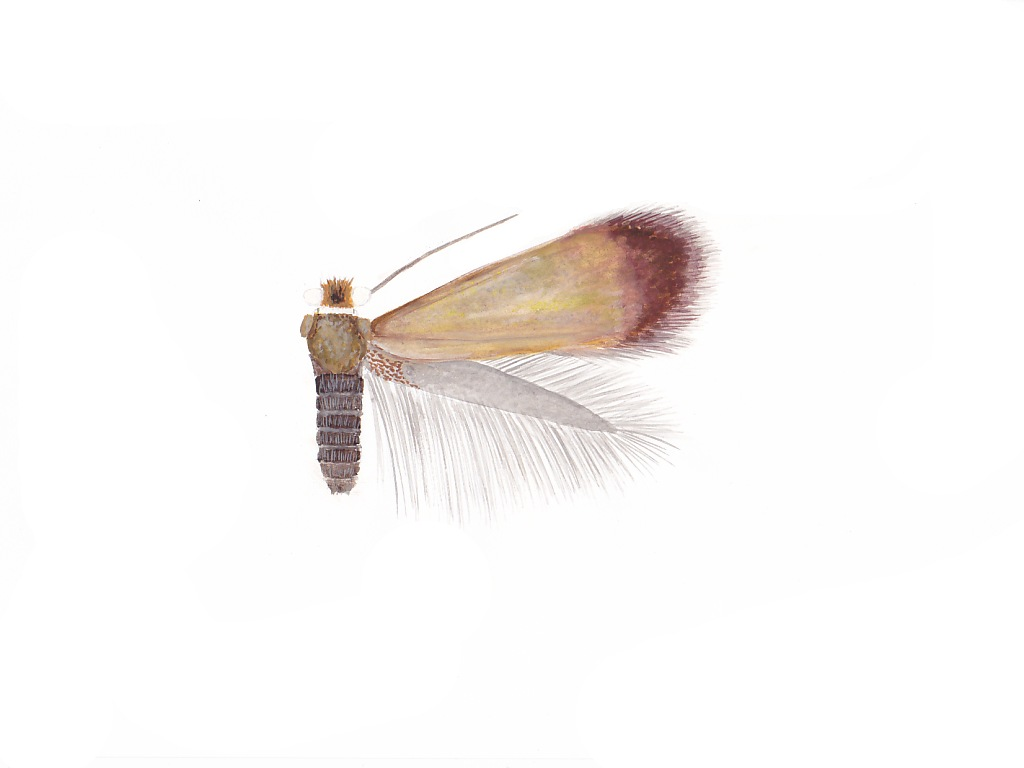

Scientific classification
- Kingdom: Animalia
- Phylum: Arthropoda
- Class: Insecta
- Order: Lepidoptera
- Family: Nepticulidae
- Genus: Stigmella
- Species: S. anomalella

Binomial name
- Stigmella anomalella (Goeze, 1783)

Synonyms
- Phalaena anomalella Goeze, 1783; Nepticula aeneella Heinemann, 1862; Stigmella caulescentella Klimesch, 1946; Nepticula fletcheri Tutt, 1899; Nepticula helbigi Hartig, 1941; Nepticula laticuniculella Sauber, 1904; Tinea penicilla Thunberg, 1794; Nepticula rosarum Sorhagen, 1922; Stigmella rosella Schrank, 1802; Stigmella rubicurrens Walsingham, 1908; Nepticula zermattensis Weber, 1937

= Stigmella anomalella =

Species of moth

The rose leaf miner (Stigmella anomalella) is a moth of the family Nepticulidae. It is found in all of Europe, east to the eastern part of the Palearctic realm.

The moths have shining greenish-bronzy forewings, lighter posteriorly and with the apical fourth purple. The wingspan is 5–6 millimetres (0.20–0.24 in). Head ferruginous-orange to black, collar yellow-whitish. Antennal eyecaps whitish. Hindwings grey.

Adults are on wing from May to August. There are two generations per year.

== Ecology ==
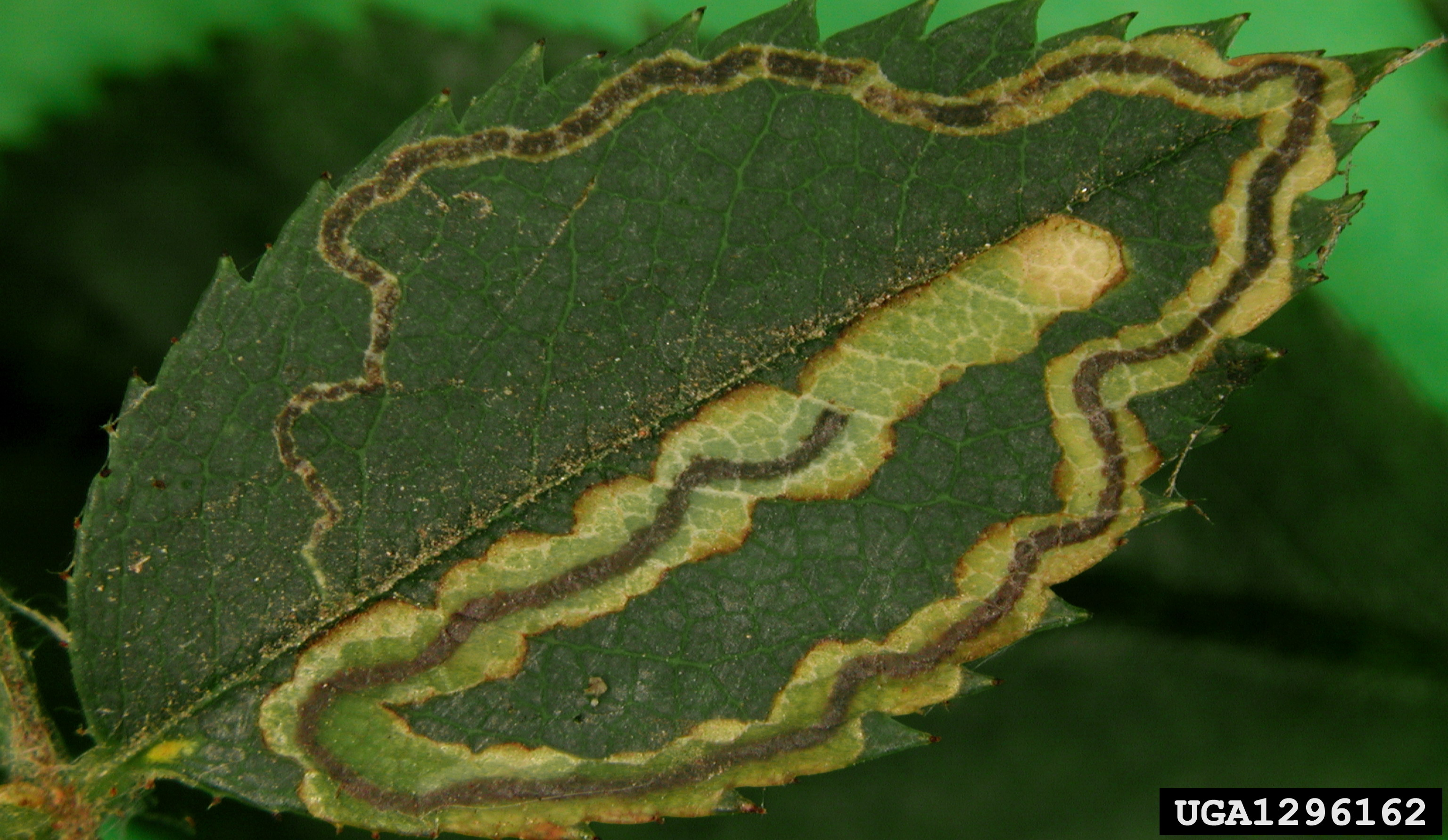
Stigmella anomalella mine

The larvae feed on Potentilla caulescens, Rosa arkansana, Rosa canina, Rosa centifolia, Rosa glauca, Rosa pendulina, Rosa rubiginosa, Rosa rugosa, Rosa tomentosa, Rosa wichurana, Sanguisorba minor and Sanguisorba officinalis. They mine the leaves of their host plant. The mine consists of a clear corridor, often with a hairpin turn. The section before the turn often follows the leaf margin. The first section of the mine is entirely filled with frass. Pupation takes place outside of the mine.
