= Moomin rose =

Rose cultivar

Moomin rose, Rosa 'Tove Jansson'
- Genus: Rosa
- Hybrid parentage: Rosa pimpinellifolia × R. spinosissima
- Cultivar: 'Tove Jansson'
- Breeder: Peter Joy

Rosa 'Tove Jansson', commonly known as the Moomin rose, is a rose created in 1990 by the Finnish rose enthusiast, Peter Joy, by crossing two well known and popular roses; Rosa pimpinellifolia 'Red Nelly' and Rosa spinosissima 'Poppius'.

Rosa pimpinellifolia 'Red Nelly' (also known as 'Single Cherry') was a cultivar discovered by the famous German rose breeder Wilhelm Kordes II in the 1930s. There is a romantic story, perhaps apocryphal, that he found the rose in a forgotten corner of an old garden, and named it 'Red Nelly' after a beautiful dark-haired maiden whom he admired. This deep cherry-red rose was very popular in Europe and Scandinavia. Unfortunately, 'Red Nelly' was not reliably hardy except in the more southern latitudes of Scandinavia. This limitation led Peter Joy to try crossing it with 'Poppius', a very old and very hardy Scandinavian variety.

'Poppius', itself a cross between Rosa spinosissima and Rosa pendulina, is a double pink cultivar raised by Carl Stenberg in Sweden in 1838. He named it after his friend and patron, the Finnish botanist Dr Gabriel Poppius, director of the Swedish Royal Academy of Agriculture. 'Poppius', an extremely popular old rose, can be found in parks and gardens throughout Scandinavia.

The cross of these two old roses produced a cherry-red single rose with the visual appeal of 'Red Nelly' and the hard qualities of 'Poppius'. Joy initially named his creation 'Mirjam Makeba', after the famous South African singer he greatly admired. His rose became immediately popular in Finland, the name eventually being shortened to 'Mirjami'. The name was later changed to 'Tove Jansson', in honour of the author of the Moomin books. It is more commonly known, however, as the 'Moomin rose'. It brings to mind Moominmama's garden and particularly the roses she paints to console herself in Tove Jansson's bittersweet masterpiece, Moominpappa at Sea (1965).

Gardeners in the UK were introduced to the Moomin rose at the 2019 RHS Chelsea Flower Show. The Moomin rose was featured in the "Roots in Finland Garden", designed by Taina Suonio.
