= Rosa sosnovskyana =

Rosa sosnovskyana can refer to:

- Rosa sosnovskyana Chrshan., a synonym of Rosa canina L.
- Rosa sosnovskyana Tamamsch., a synonym of Rosa boissieri Crép.
