= Rosa boissieri =

Scientific classification
- Kingdom: Plantae
- Clade: Tracheophytes
- Clade: Angiosperms
- Clade: Eudicots
- Clade: Rosids
- Order: Rosales
- Family: Rosaceae
- Genus: Rosa
- Species: R. boissieri

Binomial name
- Rosa boissieri Crép.

Synonyms
- List: Rosa antalyensis Manden.; Rosa boissieri var. akinfievii Chrshan.; Rosa boissieri var. azalea Lonacz.; Rosa boissieri var. bachmarensis Sosn.; Rosa boissieri var. narzanica Lonacz.; Rosa boissieri var. obovata Sosn.; Rosa boissieri var. subbidentata Sosn.; Rosa britzensis Koehne; Rosa djimilensis Boiss.; Rosa dumalis subsp. boissieri (Crép.) Ö.Nilsson; Rosa dumalis var. antalyensis (Manden.) Ö.Nilsson; Rosa montana subsp. woronowii (Lonacz.) Ö.Nilsson; Rosa sosnovskyana Tamamsch.; Rosa woronowii Lonacz.; Rosa woronowii var. setosa Lonacz.; Rosa woronowii var. subbidentata Lonacz.; Rosa woronowii var. typica Lonacz.; Rosa coriifolia var. boissieri (Crép.) Christ

Species of plant

Rosa boissieri is a species of flowering plant in the family Rosaceae. It is native to Turkey, the Transcaucasus, northern Iraq, and northern Iran. A shrub, it is pentaploid.
