= Roure, Alpes-Maritimes =

Commune in Provence-Alpes-Côte d'Azur, France

Roure
- Commune
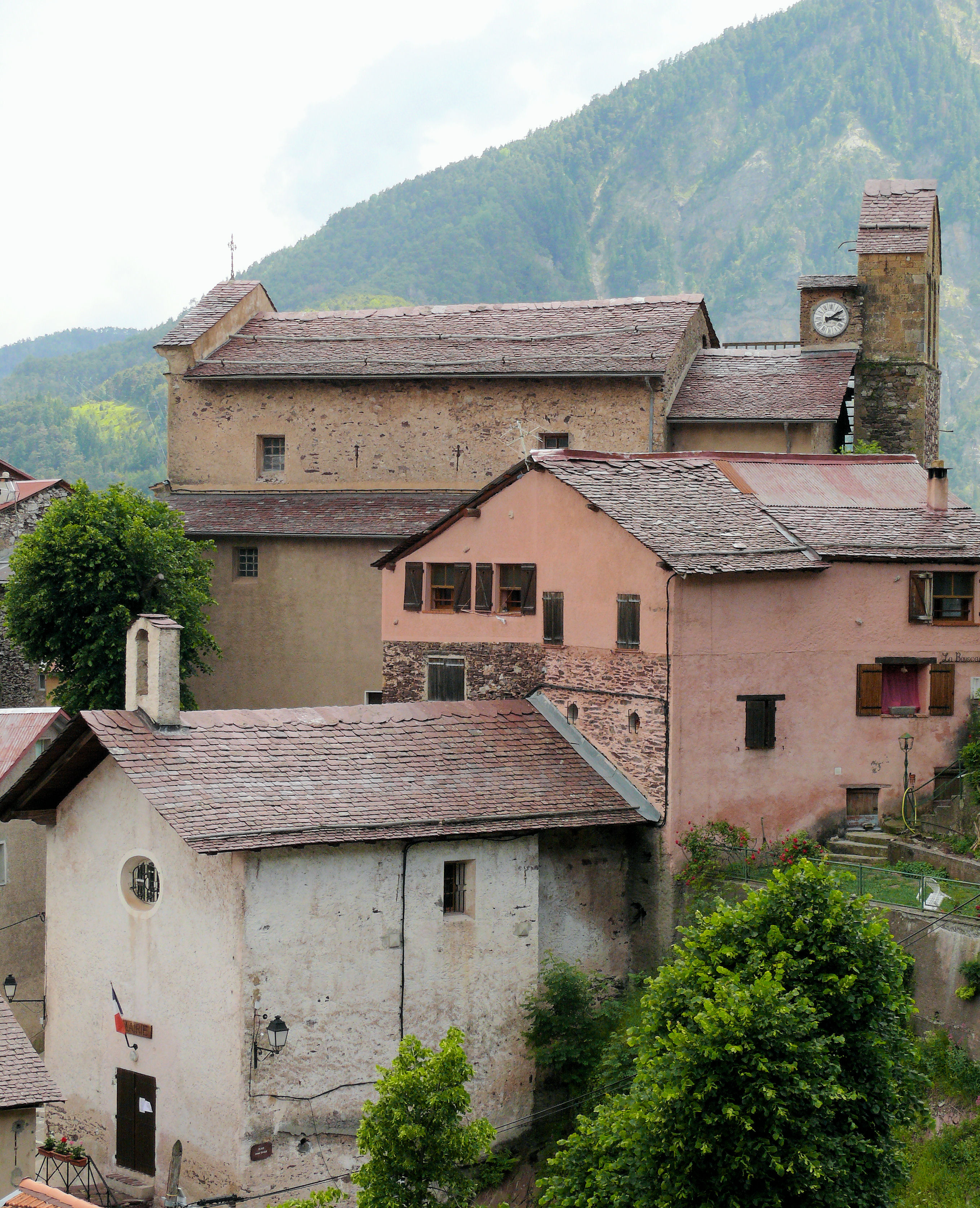
- The church of Saint-Laurent and the town hall, in Roure

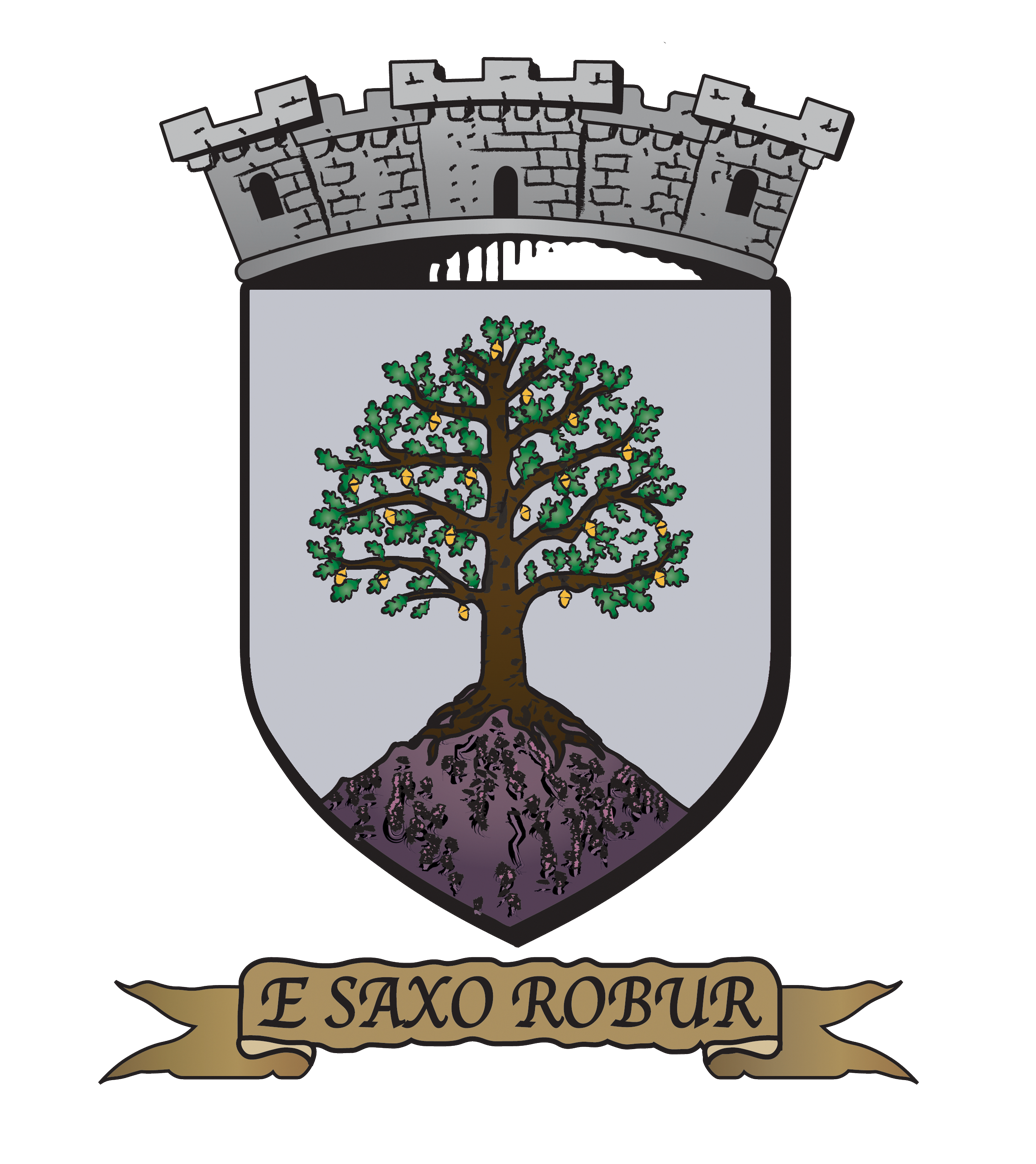
- Coat of arms
- Location of Roure
- Location within France Location within Provence-Alpes-Côte d'Azur
- Coordinates: 44°05′28″N 7°05′20″E
- Country: France
- Region: Provence-Alpes-Côte d'Azur
- Department: Alpes-Maritimes
- Arrondissement: Nice
- Canton: Tourrette-Levens
- Intercommunality: Métropole Nice Côte d'Azur

Government
  - Mayor (2026–32): Yanne Souchet
- Area^{1}: 40.3 km^{2} (15.6 sq mi)
- Elevation: 1,132 m (3,714 ft)
- Highest elevation: 2,339 m (7,674 ft)
- Lowest elevation: 500 m (1,600 ft)
- Population (2023): 116
  - Density: 2.88/km^{2} (7.46/sq mi)
- Time zone: UTC+01:00 (CET)
  - Summer (DST): UTC+02:00 (CEST)
- INSEE/Postal code: 06111 /06420
- ^{1} French Land Register data, which excludes lakes, ponds, glaciers > 1 km^{2} (0.386 sq mi or 247 acres) and river estuaries.

Roure (French pronunciation: [ʁuʁ]; Occitan: Rore; Italian: Rora) is a commune located in the department of Alpes-Maritimes department in southeastern France in the Provence-Alpes-Côte d'Azur. It is a medieval village with agro-pastoral architecture.

== Geography ==
The village is situated at the entrance of the Tinée Valley, at the edge of the Mercantour National Park, at an elevation of 1100 m. The village is accessible by road from Nice through the RN 202, towards Digne then 2205 RD, the RD 30 and RD 130. Also by path through the GR 5. The village contains five little villages: Rougios, lost in the mountains, Tiecs, la Cerise, Puch and Valabres where there was a priest and a school until 1904.

== Toponymy ==
The first indication of the village dates from 1067 under the name "Rora", derived from the Latin word "robur" which means "oak". Villagers raised and tended cows and goat herds on behalf of their owners and concluded business under a large oak tree. Hence, the origin of the village's name.

== Population ==
Its inhabitants are called Rourois in French.

Historical population
Year	Pop.	±% p.a.
1968	98	—
1975	71	−4.50%
1982	112	+6.73%
1990	147	+3.46%
1999	167	+1.43%
2007	204	+2.53%
2012	205	+0.10%
2017	173	−3.34%
2023	116	−6.44%
Source: INSEE

== Main sights ==
- Arboretum Marcel Kroenlein

== See also ==
- Communes of the Alpes-Maritimes department
- Communes of the region Provence-Alpes-Côte d'Azur. Traditionally named Provence.
