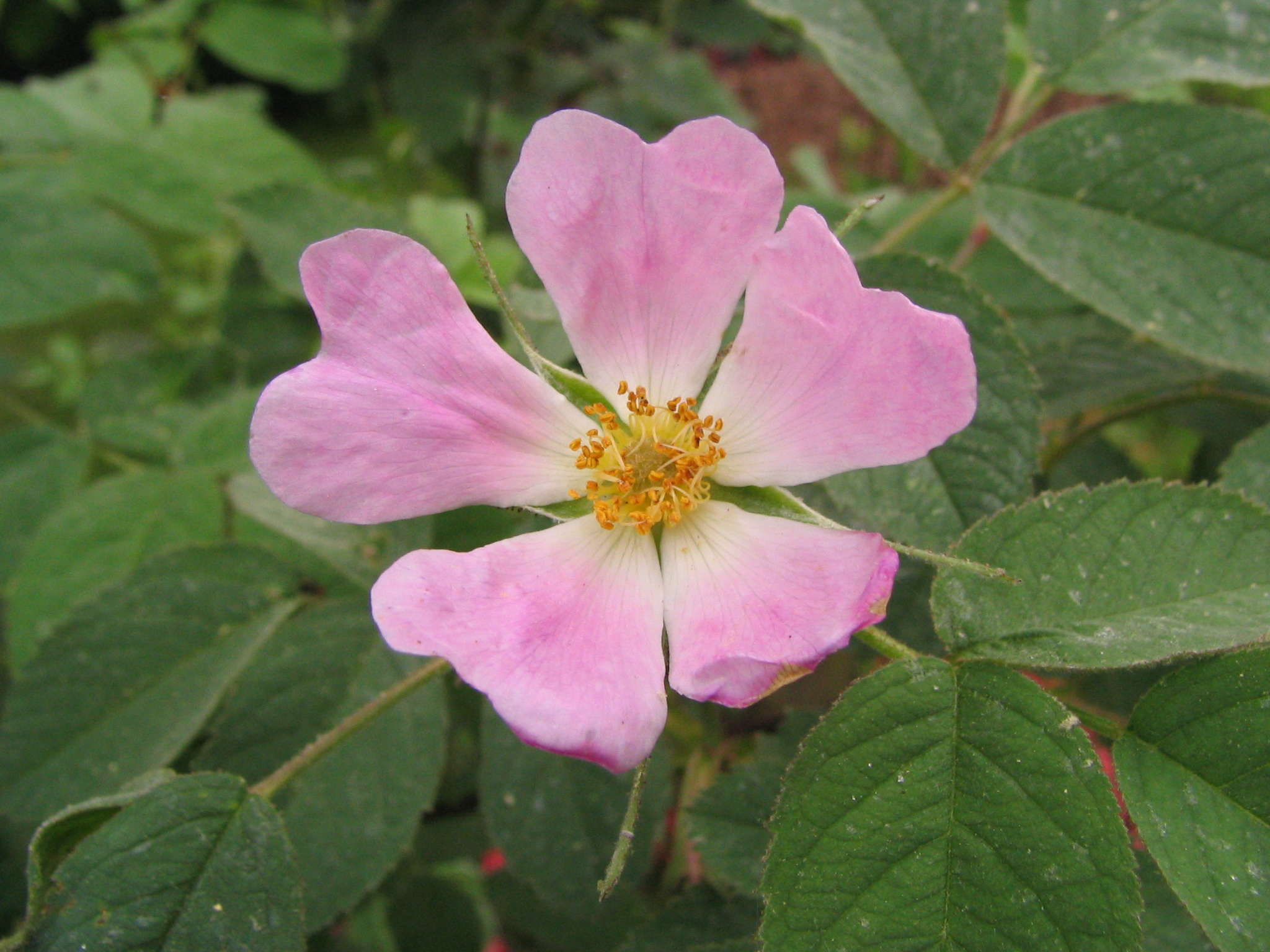

Scientific classification
- Kingdom: Plantae
- Clade: Tracheophytes
- Clade: Angiosperms
- Clade: Eudicots
- Clade: Rosids
- Order: Rosales
- Family: Rosaceae
- Genus: Rosa
- Species: R. mollis

Binomial name
- Rosa mollis Sm.

= Rosa mollis =

Species of flowering plant

Rosa mollis is a species of wild rose. Common name: soft downy-rose. It is most closely related to Rosa villosa. Rosa mollis can be distinguished from Rosa villosa by its longer leaves and pruinose stem, which is absent in the latter. Rosa mollis usually blossoms in Germany for approximately 5 weeks from the end of June to July

It is native to the Caucasus and parts of Europe: the British Isles, Scandinavia, and the lands around the Baltic. It has been commonly reported in isolated areas throughout the rest of Europe; this fact has prompted the editors of Atlas Florae Europaeae to raise the question whether these may not be cases of misidentification of either Rosa villosa or Rosa sherardii.
