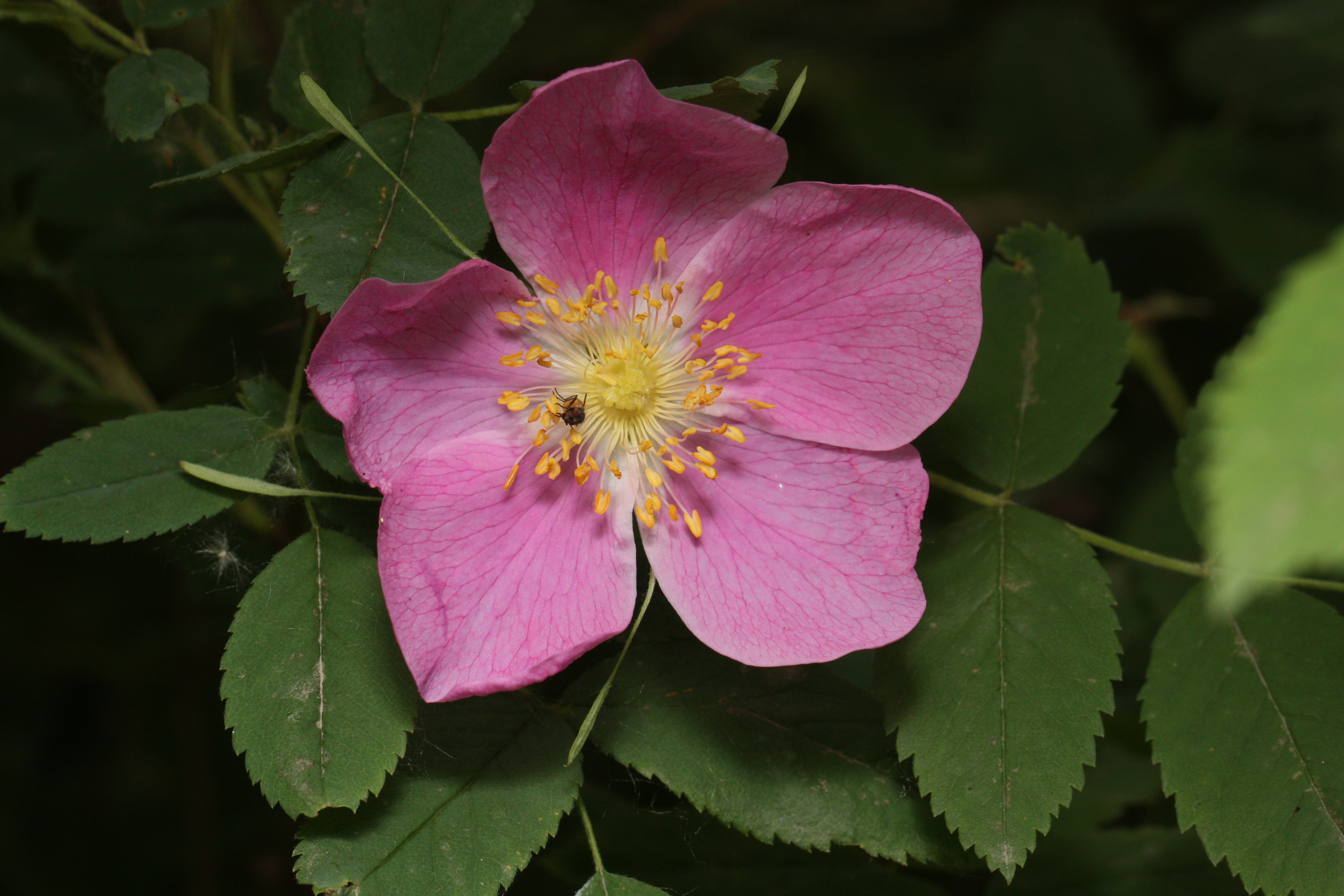

Conservation status
- Least Concern (IUCN 3.1)

Scientific classification
- Kingdom: Plantae
- Clade: Embryophytes
- Clade: Tracheophytes
- Clade: Spermatophytes
- Clade: Angiosperms
- Clade: Eudicots
- Clade: Rosids
- Order: Rosales
- Family: Rosaceae
- Genus: Rosa
- Species: R. acicularis

Binomial name
- Rosa acicularis Lindl.

Subspecies
- R. a. subsp. acicularis; R. a. subsp. sayi (Schwein.) W.H.Lewis

Synonyms
- Rosa baicalensis Turcz. ex Besser; Rosa carelica Fr.; Rosa gmelinii Bunge; Rosa nipponensis Crép.

= Rosa acicularis =

Species of plant

Rosa acicularis is a flowering plant in the Rosaceae family. It is commonly known as the prickly wild rose, prickly rose, bristly rose, wild rose or Arctic rose. It is a species of wild rose with a Holarctic distribution in northern regions of Asia, Europe, and North America.

== Description ==
Rosa acicularis is a deciduous shrub growing 1–3 m tall. The leaves are pinnate, 7–14 cm long, with three to seven leaflets. The leaflets are ovate, with serrate (toothed) margins. The flowers are pink (rarely white), 3.5–5 cm diameter; the hips are red, pear-shaped to ovoid, 10–15 mm diameter. Its native habitats include thickets, stream banks, rocky bluffs, and wooded hillsides.

The ploidy of this rose species is variable. Botanical authorities have listed it as tetraploid and hexaploid in North America (subsp. sayi), and octoploid in Eurasia (subsp. acicularis), including China. On the northern Great Plains its populations are generally tetraploid. Hexaploid populations exist in the Yukon.

=== North America ===
This rose is a native species of the northern Great Plains and is the provincial flower of Alberta. It is not as common in the Parkland region of the Canadian Prairie provinces as Rosa woodsii (Woods' rose), nor is it as common as Rosa woodsii in the boreal forest of northern North America.

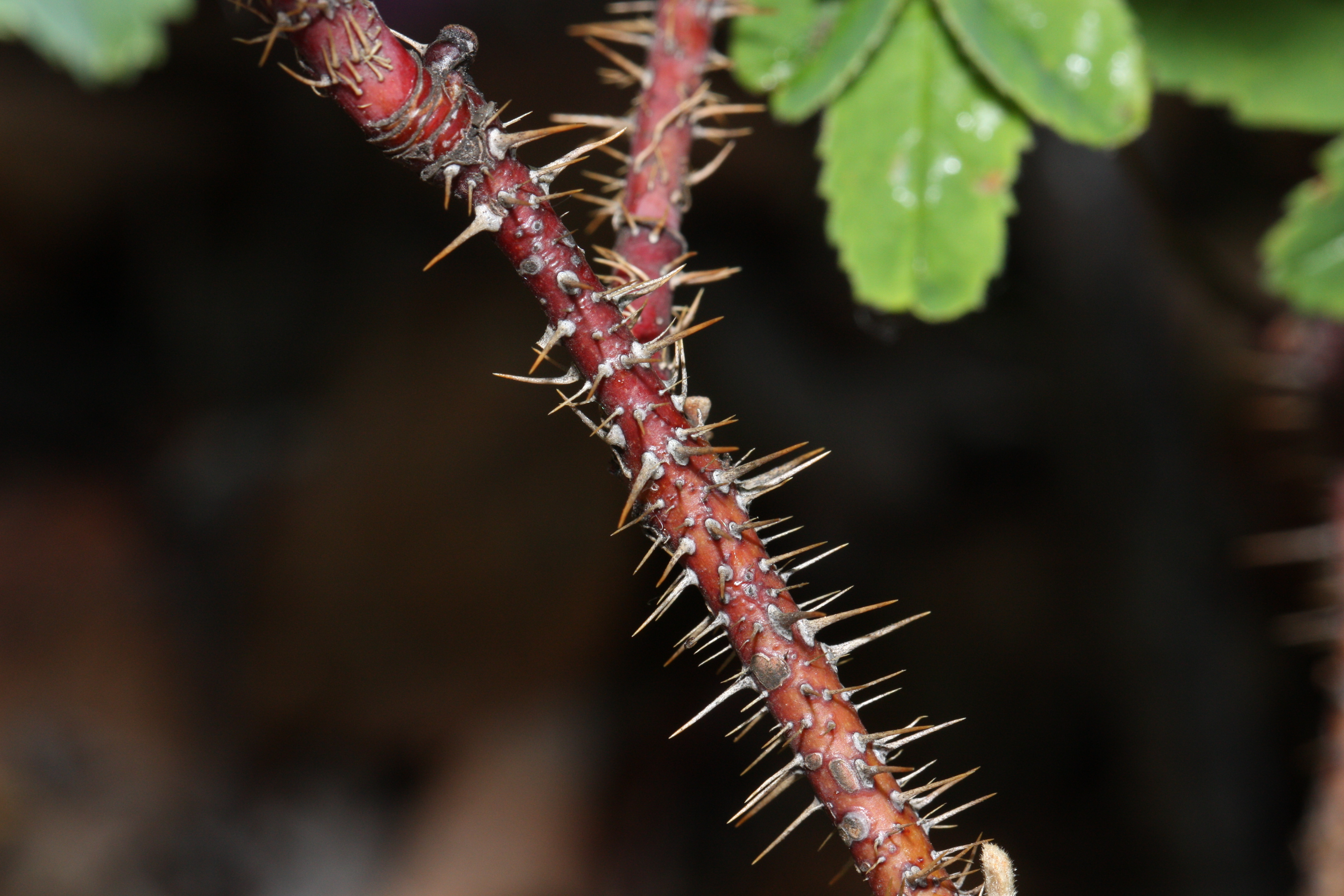
Larger stems are usually densely covered with straight prickles.

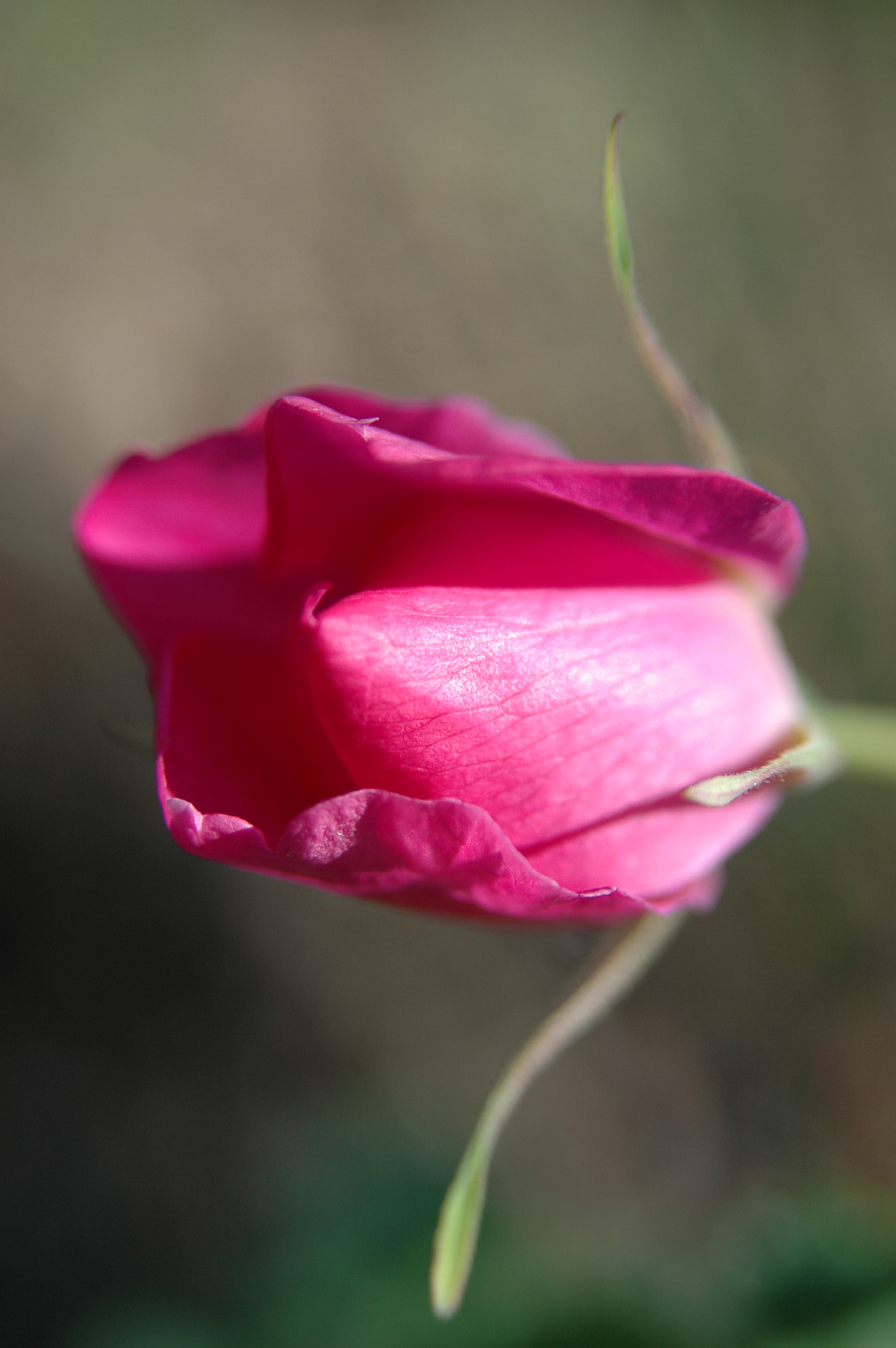
Young flowers are darker in colour.

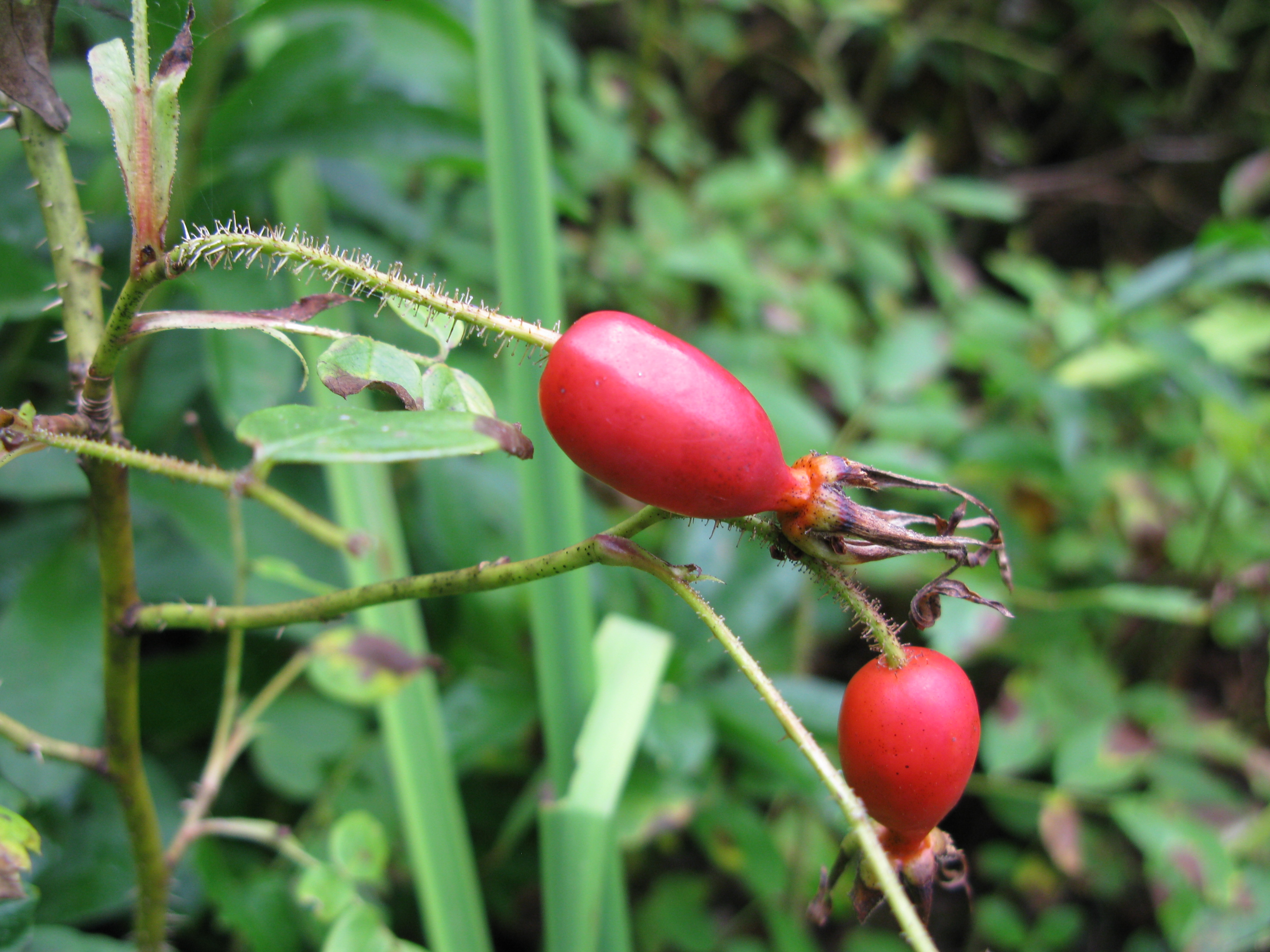
The fruit is usually elongated as shown here.

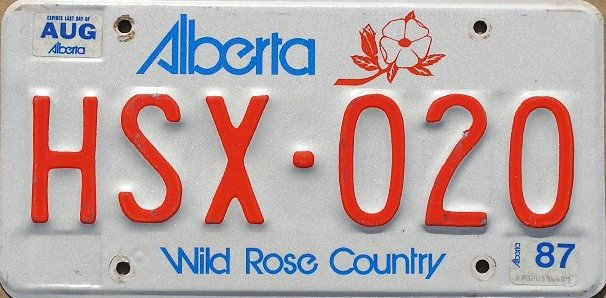
Since 1983 Rosa acicularis has been pictured on licence plates in the Canadian province of Alberta.

== Uses ==
The hips, which stay on the plant through winter, are reported to be high in vitamins A and C. Native Americans made tea and salad from the leaves, and used the inner bark to smoke tobacco. Perfume has also been made from this plant. The Fraser River Stl'atl'mx use R. acicularis blooming as a temporal sign of the first sockeye run and second spring salmon run up the Fraser River, and Lil'wat/Stl'atl'mx use its blooming as a temporal sign to harvest basket materials like western redcedar, cherry bark, and basket grass.

== See also ==
- List of Rosa species
