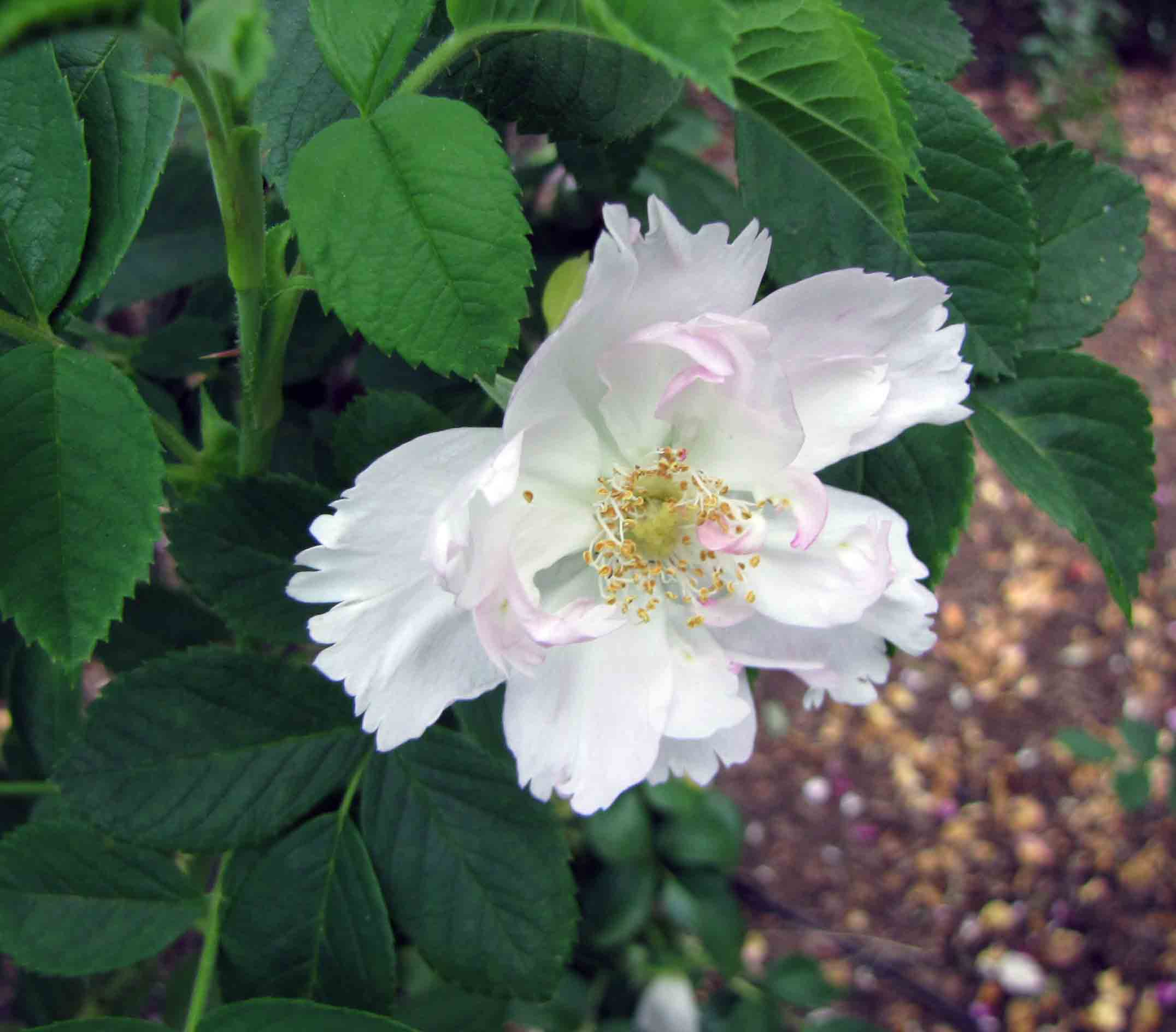

Scientific classification
- Kingdom: Plantae
- Clade: Tracheophytes
- Clade: Angiosperms
- Clade: Eudicots
- Clade: Rosids
- Order: Rosales
- Family: Rosaceae
- Genus: Rosa
- Species: R. soulieana

Binomial name
- Rosa soulieana Crép.

Synonyms
- Rosa moschata var. yunnanensis Focke

= Rosa soulieana =

Species of plant

Rosa soulieana, or Soulié's rose (川滇蔷薇 chuan dian qiang wei), is a species of flowering plant in the family Rosaceae, native to China (southern Anhui, Chongqing, Sichuan, Tibet, and Yunnan).

Growing to 2.5–4 m (8–13 ft) tall by 4–8 m (13–26 ft) broad, it is an extremely vigorous, deciduous shrub with very long, spiny branches, covered in masses of small, grey-green leaflets. In summer it bears many small single white roses, each with a lax central boss of pale yellow. The flowers have a light clove scent, and are followed in autumn by orange-red hips.

In cultivation it can be trained as a rambler. It is hardy, but prefers a position in full sun.

The plant was collected in China by the French missionary and botanist Jean-André Soulié. who sent samples back to the Vilmorin Collection in France around 1895. A plant was then sent to Kew Gardens in England in 1895.

== Subtaxa ==
The following varieties are accepted:

- Rosa soulieana var. microphylla T.T.Yu & T.C.Ku – Tibet, Yunnan
- Rosa soulieana var. soulieana – entire range
- Rosa soulieana var. sungpanensis Rehder – northern Sichuan
- Rosa soulieana var. yunnanensis C.K.Schneid. – Chongqing, central Sichuan, northwestern Yunnan
