= Yarigong Township, Sichuan =

Yarigong Township 亚日贡乡
- Township
- Yarigongxiang
- Location in Sichuan
- Coordinates: 29°27′27″N 99°22′4″E
- Country: People's Republic of China
- Province: Sichuan
- Autonomous prefecture: Garzê Tibetan Autonomous Prefecture
- County: Batang County

Area
  - Total: 1,017 km^{2} (393 sq mi)

Population (2010)
  - Total: 3,275
  - Density: 3.220/km^{2} (8.340/sq mi)
- Time zone: UTC+8 (China Standard)

Yarigong (Tibetan: ཡར་རི་སྒང་, Wylie: yar ri sgang; simplified Chinese: 亚日贡乡; traditional Chinese: 亞日貢鄉) is a township in Batang County, Garzê Tibetan Autonomous Prefecture, Sichuan, China. In 2010, Yarigong Township had a total population of 3,275: 1,669 males and 1,606 females: 968 aged under 14, 2,180 aged between 15 and 65 and 127 aged over 65.
