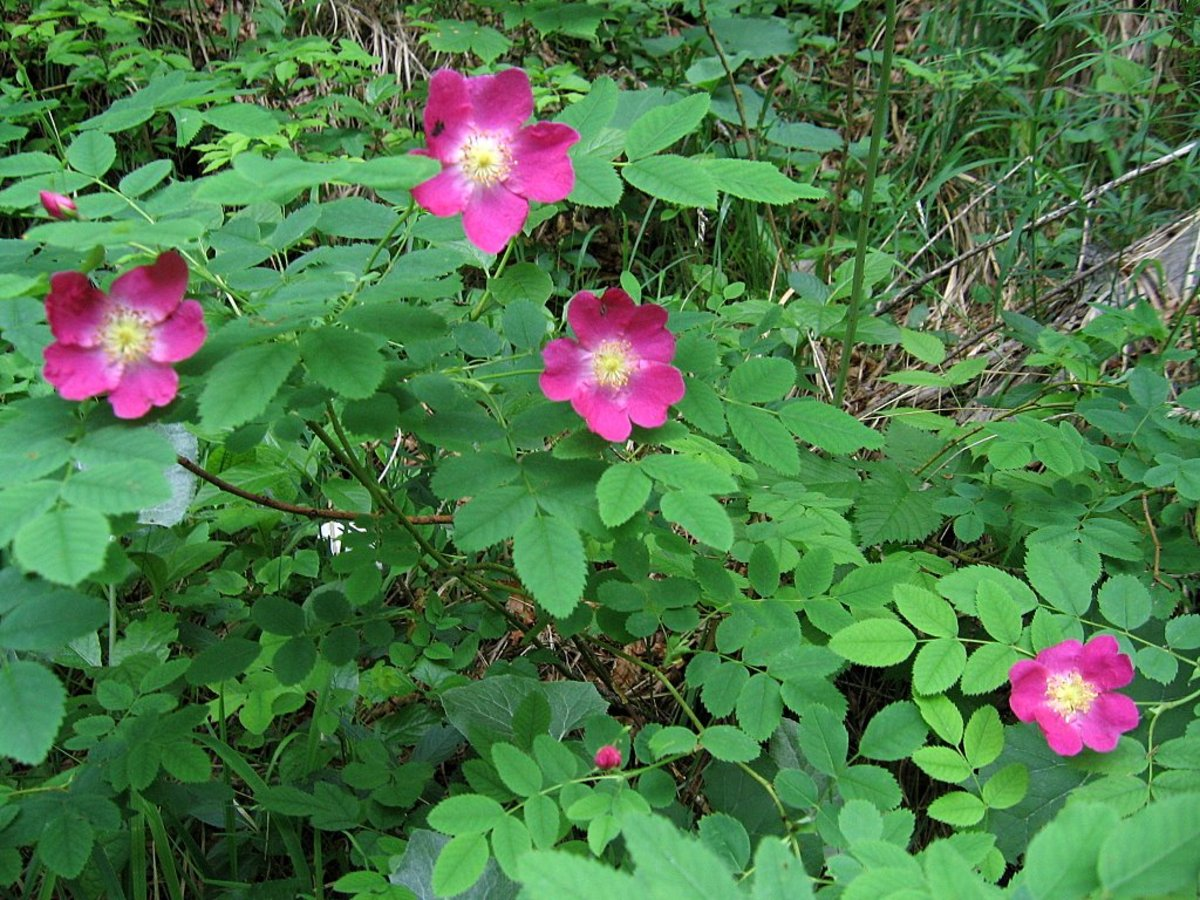

Conservation status
- Least Concern (IUCN 3.1)

Scientific classification
- Kingdom: Plantae
- Clade: Tracheophytes
- Clade: Angiosperms
- Clade: Eudicots
- Clade: Rosids
- Order: Rosales
- Family: Rosaceae
- Genus: Rosa
- Species: R. pendulina

Binomial name
- Rosa pendulina L.

Synonyms
- List: Ozanonia alpina (L. ex Hartm.) Gand.; Ripartia pyrenaica Gand.; Rosa adenophora Kit.; Rosa adjecta D‚s‚gl.; Rosa affinis Sternb.; Rosa alpina L.; Rosa alpina var. aculeata Ser.; Rosa alpina subsp. aculeata (Ser.) Arcang.; Rosa alpina var. adjecta (D‚s‚gl.) Nyman; Rosa alpina var. bordereana Rouy; Rosa alpina var. glandulosa (Bellardi ex Ser.) Nyman; Rosa alpina var. globosa Desv.; Rosa alpina var. gratianopolitana Rouy; Rosa alpina var. heterophylla Rouy; Rosa alpina var. humilis Rouy; Rosa alpina var. intermedia Gren.; Rosa alpina var. laevis Ser.; Rosa alpina subsp. laevis (Ser.) Arcang.; Rosa alpina var. lagenaria (Vill.) Ser.; Rosa alpina var. lamotteana Rouy; Rosa alpina var. latifolia Ser.; Rosa alpina var. lixoniensis Rouy; Rosa alpina var. macroacantha Rouy; Rosa alpina var. macrophylla Hagenb.; Rosa alpina var. monspeliaca (Gouan) Steud.; Rosa alpina subsp. monspeliaca (Gouan) Nyman; Rosa alpina var. montisludovici Rouy; Rosa alpina var. norica J.B.Keller; Rosa alpina var. nuda Gren.; Rosa alpina var. nudipes Rouy; Rosa alpina var. ovoidea Rouy; Rosa alpina var. pendulina (L.) Loisel. & Michel; Rosa alpina var. provincialis Rouy; Rosa alpina var. pseudopyrenaica Rouy; Rosa alpina var. pubescens Gren.; Rosa alpina var. pyrenaica (Gouan) Ser.; Rosa alpina subsp. pyrenaica (Gouan) Nyman; Rosa alpina var. rotundifolia Boullu; Rosa alpina var. setosa Ser.; Rosa alpina var. subglobosa Rouy; Rosa alpina var. sublaevis Rouy; Rosa alpina var. vestita Gren.; Rosa alpiniformis Haynald ex Borb s; Rosa aucuparioides Debeaux; Rosa balcanica Dimitrov; Rosa balsamea Kit.; Rosa brandisii J.B.Keller ex Wiesb.; Rosa cinnamomea L.; Rosa cinnamomea var. globosa Desv.; Rosa coccialba Kmet; Rosa croatica Kit. ex Kanitz; Rosa detonsa Debeaux; Rosa diplacantha (Borb s) Heinr.Braun; Rosa filispina Debeaux; Rosa glandulosa Bellardi; Rosa hybrida Vill.; Rosa inermis Turra; Rosa × intercalaris D‚s‚gl.; Rosa laevis (Ser.) Dalla Torre & Sarnth.; Rosa lagenaria Vill.; Rosa majalis var. globosa (Desv.) P.V.Heath; Rosa × malyi A.Kern.; Rosa monspeliaca Gouan; Rosa odoratissima Scop.; Rosa pendula Salisb.; Rosa pendula Roth; Rosa pendulina var. aculeata (Ser.) R.Keller; Rosa pendulina var. adenophora (Kit.) R.Keller; Rosa pendulina var. alpina (L. ex Hartm.) Heinr.Braun; Rosa pendulina var. balsamea (Kit.) R.Keller; Rosa pendulina var. borbasii R.Keller; Rosa pendulina var. bosniaca (J.B.Keller & Wiesb.) R.Keller; Rosa pendulina var. croatica (Kit.) Borb s; Rosa pendulina var. curtidens (H.Christ) R.Keller; Rosa pendulina var. ebelii (Heinr.Braun) R.Keller; Rosa pendulina subsp. ebelii Heinr.Braun; Rosa pendulina var. globosa (Desv.) Hayek; Rosa pendulina var. imhoofii R.Keller; Rosa pendulina var. intercalaris (D‚s‚gl.) R.Keller; Rosa pendulina var. intermedia (Gren.) C.Vicioso; Rosa pendulina var. laevis (Ser.) R.Keller; Rosa pendulina var. lagenaria (Vill.) Heinr.Braun; Rosa pendulina subsp. mediterranea Kl št.; Rosa pendulina var. norica (J.B.Keller) Heinr.Braun; Rosa pendulina var. opaca Chrshan.; Rosa pendulina var. ovoidea (Rouy) C.Vicioso; Rosa pendulina var. popovii Chrshan.; Rosa pendulina var. pseudopyrenaica (Rouy) C.Vicioso; Rosa pendulina var. pubescens (W.D.J.Koch) R.Keller; Rosa pendulina var. pyrenaica (Gouan) Fiori; Rosa pendulina var. rupestris Crantz ex Heinr.Braun; Rosa pendulina var. scabriuscula (H.Christ) R.Keller; Rosa pendulina var. setosa (Ser.) R.Keller; Rosa pendulina var. sternbergii (Heinr.Braun) Heinr.Braun; Rosa pendulina var. sublaevis (Rouy) C.Vicioso; Rosa pimpinellifolia subsp. alpina L. ex Hartm.; Rosa pyrenaica Gouan; Rosa recurva Kit.; Rosa reversa W.D.J.Koch; Rosa rubrifolia var. glandulosa Bellardi ex Ser.; Rosa rupestris Crantz; Rosa semisimplex (Borb s) Heinr.Braun; Rosa semisimplex var. adenophora (Kit.) Borb s ex R.Keller; Rosa setosa (Ser.) Dalla Torre & Sarnth.; Rosa stenodonta (Borb s) Heinr.Braun; Rosa tenuiflora (Borb s) Heinr.Braun; Rosa turbinata Vill.; Rosa villarsii Tratt. ex Link

= Rosa pendulina =

Species of plant

Rosa pendulina, (syn. Rosa alpina), the Alpine rose or mountain rose, is a species of wild rose found in the mountains of central and southern Europe. It appears to have survived in glacial refugia in the Alps and Carpathians, and spread out from there. A climbing shrub with deep pink flowers and relatively few thorns, it has had a history of cultivation as an ornamental plant.

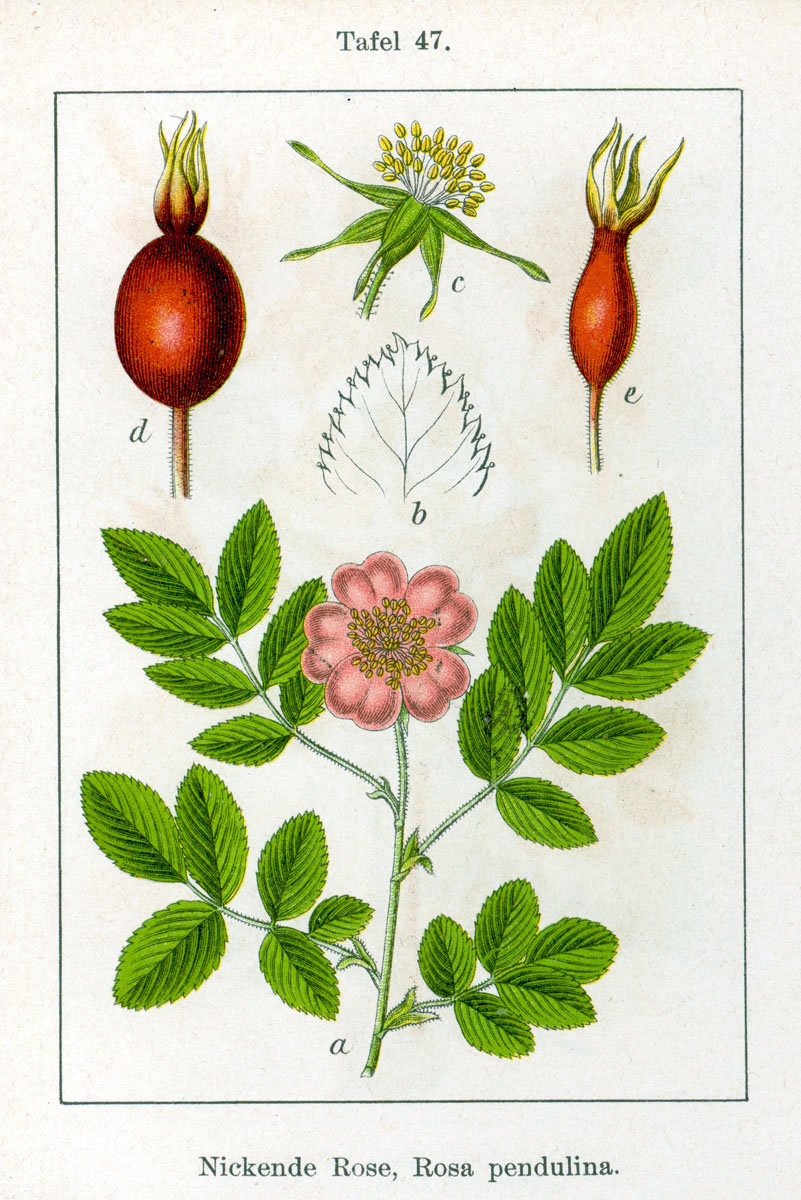
Botanical illustration

== Description ==
Rosa pendulina is a climbing (or rambling) shrub between 0.5 and 2 m, rarely 3 m tall. The flowers are typically semi-doubled and deep pink to fuchsia, brightening towards the center. It can be distinguished from other members of its genus by its relative lack of thorns (prickles), especially higher up on the plant, its oblong fruits (hips) which hang downwards (are pendulous, hence the specific epithet), its hispid peduncles and petioles, and its smooth stems and branches. The chromosome number is 4n = 28.

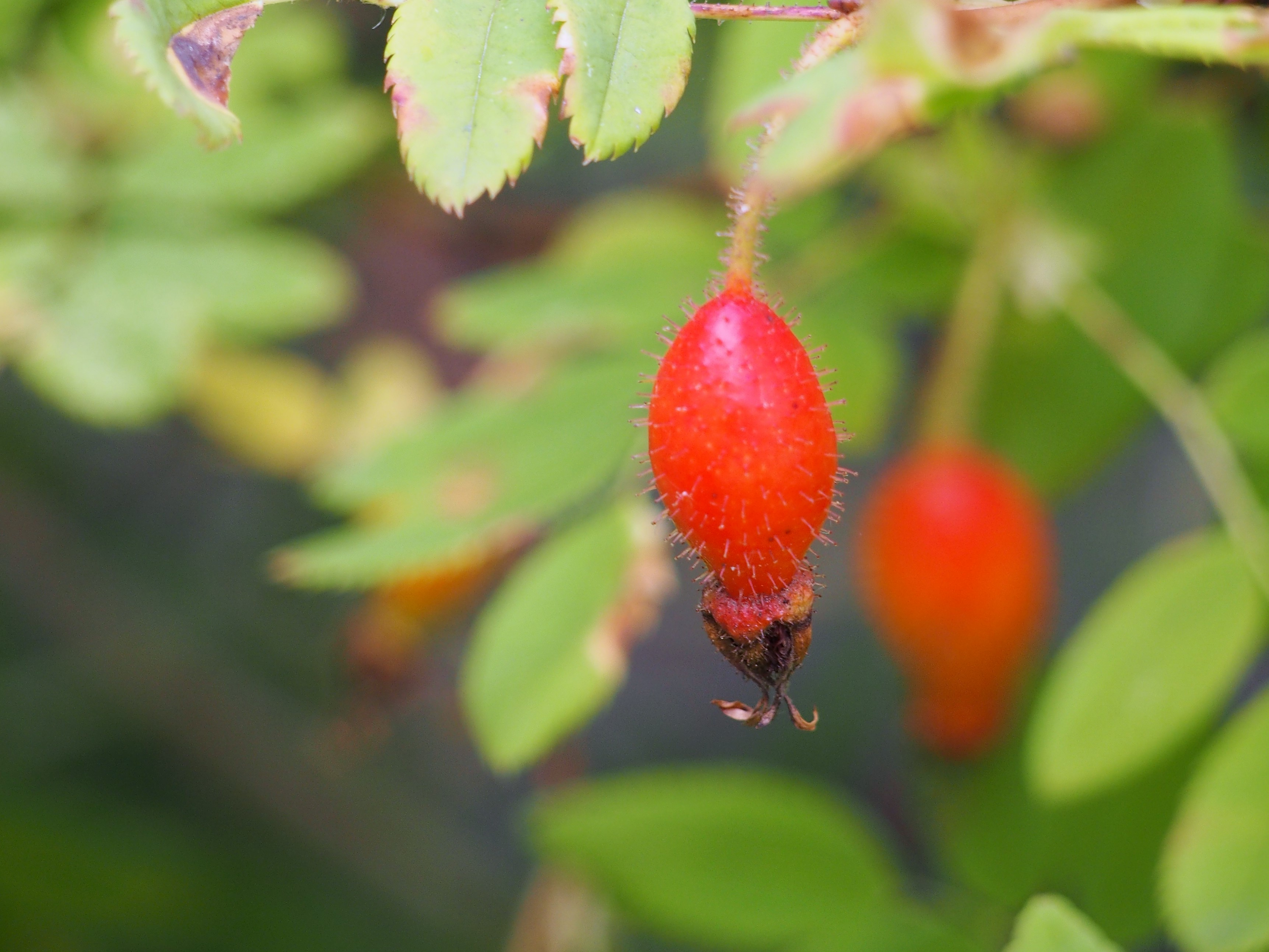
Ripe hips

== Distribution ==
It prefers to grow in relatively warmer, shadier, and wetter areas alongside streams, in openings in forests, or on rock piles, between 350 and 2,500 m above sea level.

It is mostly found in the subalpine zone of the mountains of Central and Southern Europe: the Pyrenees, the Massif Central, the Alps (at elevations of up to 2300–2600 m in the various parts of the range), throughout the Carpathians (up to 1800 m in the Tatras), in Czechia and adjacent areas of Germany and Poland, in the Apennines and in the mountains of the Balkan Peninsula (at elevations of 1000–2500 m in Bulgaria).

It has been introduced to New England and can be found growing as a garden escapee elsewhere.

== Cultivation ==
Often called by its synonym Rosa alpina, the Alpine rose has been in cultivation for hundreds of years (c. 1683), with many varieties that are practically forgotten today. It has contributed genetically to an unknown, but large, number of extant rose cultivars. It flowers early, has a pleasing, strong fragrance, and is nearly thornless, all desirable traits for rose breeders. An undesirable trait is that it has weak pedicels supporting the flowers, which leads to the pendulous habit of the fruits. It is hardy to USDA Zone 4a.

== Varieties ==
Numerous varieties (and even subspecies) were described for R. pendulina and R. alpina (see list of synonyms), but these have all been collapsed into R. pendulina.

== Hybrids ==
Rosa pendulina is said to be the parent of a number of hybrids.

- Rosa × anachoretica Schmidely (R. montana × R. pendulina)
- Rosa × buseri Rouy (R. pendulina × R. sherardii)
- Rosa × brueggeri Killias (R. glauca × R. pendulina)
- Rosa × hispidocarpa (J.B. Keller) G. Beck (R. canina × R. pendulina)
- Rosa × intercalaris Déségl. (R. pendulina × R. villosa)
- Rosa × iserana Rouy (R. pendulina × R. rubiginosa)
- Rosa × lheritierana Thory (R. chinensis × R. pendulina)
- Rosa × reversa Kit. (R. pendulina × R. spinosissima)
- Rosa × salaevensis Rapin (R. dumalis × R. pendulina)
- Rosa × spinulifolia Dematra (R. pendulina × R. tomentosa)
- Rosa × wasserburgensis Kirschleger (R. trachyphylla × R. pendulina × R. tomentosa)

== Cultivars ==
Many of these cultivars are quite old and would be assessed differently using modern standards. Rose fanciers tended to call all sports, chance seedlings, regional variants, natural hybrids, and artificial hybrids "varieties" rather than "cultivars". Some, such as the Boursault roses, would probably be considered Groups today. Simply having some R. pendulina ancestry, such as with the Moomin rose (Rosa 'Tove Jansson'), does not make a rose a cultivar of R. pendulina.

- 'Amadis' (Crimson Boursault. The Boursaults are said to be R. chinensis × R. pendulina with some uncertainty)
- 'Bourgogne'
- 'Calypso' (Blush Boursault)
- 'Harstad'
- 'Inermis', also called 'Morletti' or 'Morlettii'
- 'Mount Everest'
- 'Nana'
- 'Plena' (could be 'Inermis')
