= Saint-Juéry, Aveyron =

Commune in Occitanie, France

Saint-Juéry
- Commune
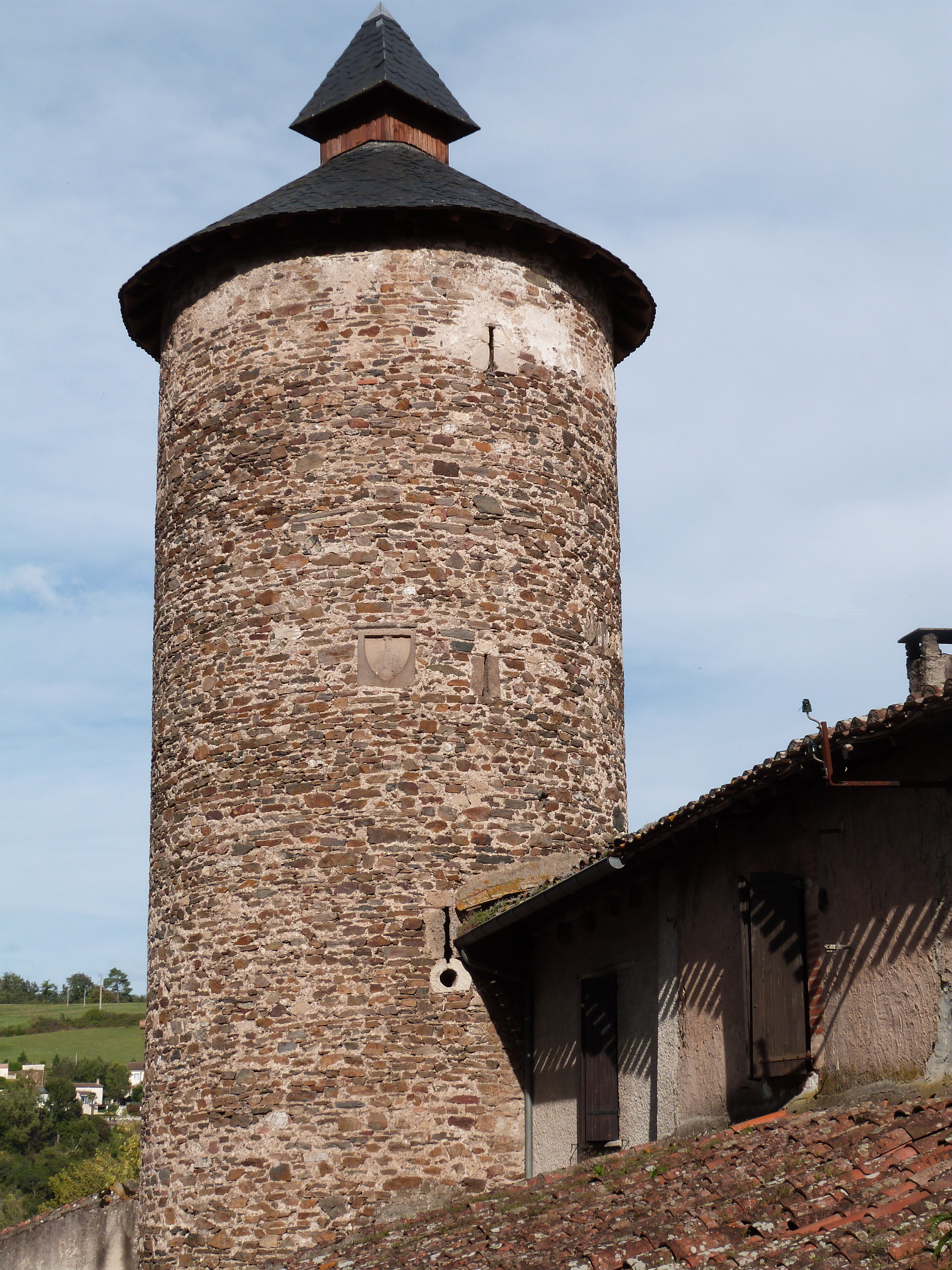
- The tower of Avalats
- Location of Saint-Juéry
- Location within France Location within Occitanie
- Coordinates: 43°54′39″N 2°41′47″E
- Country: France
- Region: Occitania
- Department: Aveyron
- Arrondissement: Millau
- Canton: Causses-Rougiers

Government
  - Mayor (2020–2026): Thierry Roques
- Area^{1}: 29.01 km^{2} (11.20 sq mi)
- Elevation: 500 m (1,600 ft)
- Highest elevation: 637 m (2,090 ft)
- Lowest elevation: 289 m (948 ft)
- Population (2023): 256
  - Density: 8.82/km^{2} (22.9/sq mi)
- Time zone: UTC+01:00 (CET)
  - Summer (DST): UTC+02:00 (CEST)
- INSEE/Postal code: 12233 /12550
- ^{1} French Land Register data, which excludes lakes, ponds, glaciers > 1 km^{2} (0.386 sq mi or 247 acres) and river estuaries.

Saint-Juéry (French pronunciation: [sɛ̃ ʒɥeʁi]; Occitan: Sant Jòri) is a commune in the Aveyron department in southern France.

== Population ==
Historical population
Year	Pop.	±% p.a.
1968	396	—
1975	356	−1.51%
1982	322	−1.42%
1990	290	−1.30%
1999	257	−1.33%
2007	228	−1.49%
2012	255	+2.26%
2017	287	+2.39%
2023	256	−1.89%
Source: INSEE

== See also ==
- Communes of the Aveyron department
