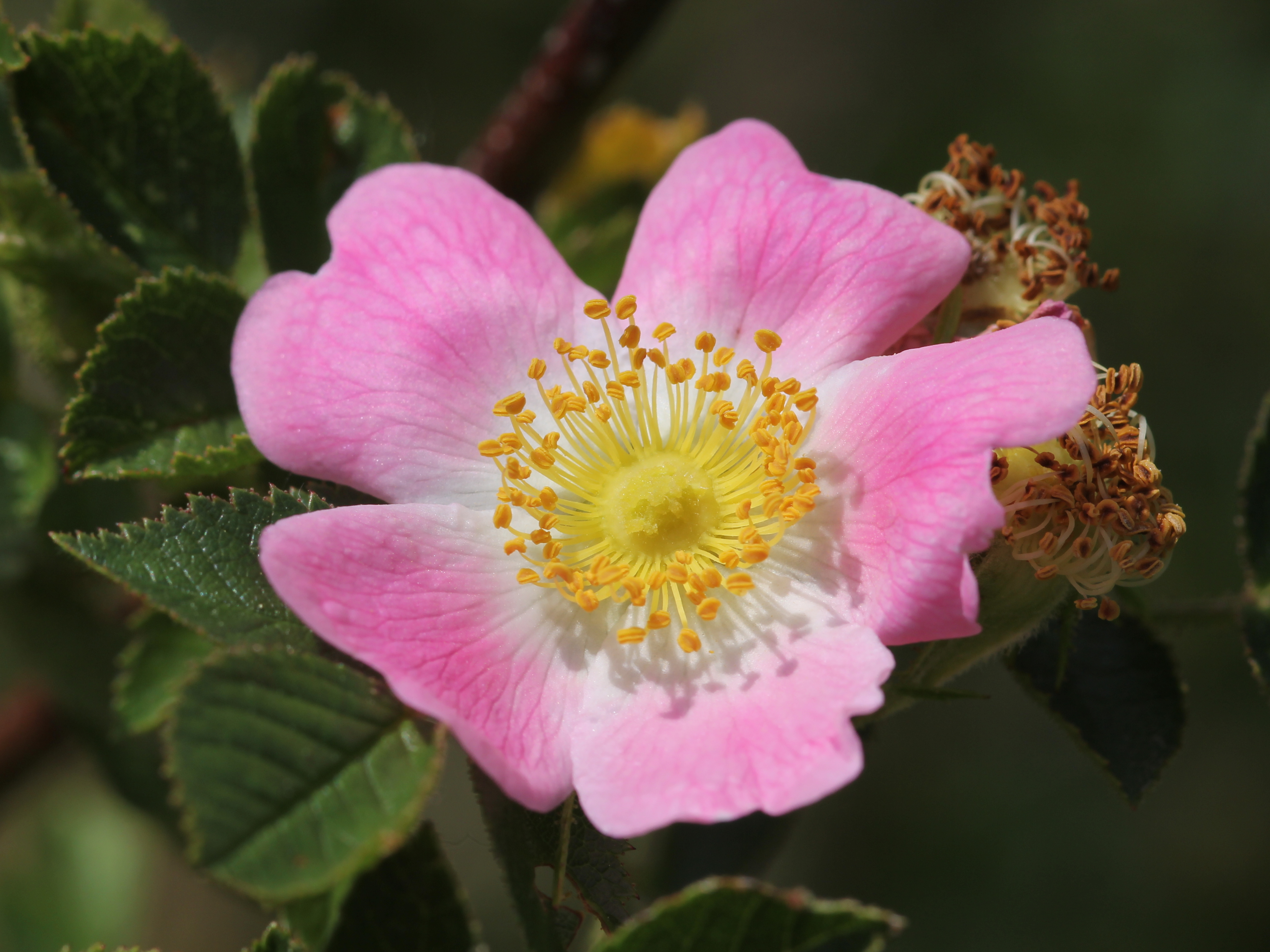

Scientific classification
- Kingdom: Plantae
- Clade: Tracheophytes
- Clade: Angiosperms
- Clade: Eudicots
- Clade: Rosids
- Order: Rosales
- Family: Rosaceae
- Genus: Rosa
- Species: R. villosa

Binomial name
- Rosa villosa L.

Synonyms
- Rosa pomifera

= Rosa villosa =

Species of flowering plant

Rosa villosa, the apple rose, is a species of rose. It was described in 1753.

== Description ==
Its fruit persists for an average of 30 days, and bears an average of 23 seeds per fruit. Fruits average 68.1% water, and their dry weight includes 20.8% carbohydrates and 0.8% lipids.

== Distribution ==
It is native to Europe, where it is found in the central, southern and southeastern parts of the continent, including southwestern Russia.

== Taxonomy ==
It is most closely related to Rosa mollis, with which it is sometimes confused.

== Bibliography ==
- Ehrlén, Johan; Eriksson, Ove (1991). "Phenological variation in fruit characteristics in vertebrate-dispersed plants". Oecologia. 86 (4): 463–470. doi:10.1007/BF00318311. ISSN 0029-8549.
