= François Crépin =

Belgian botanist

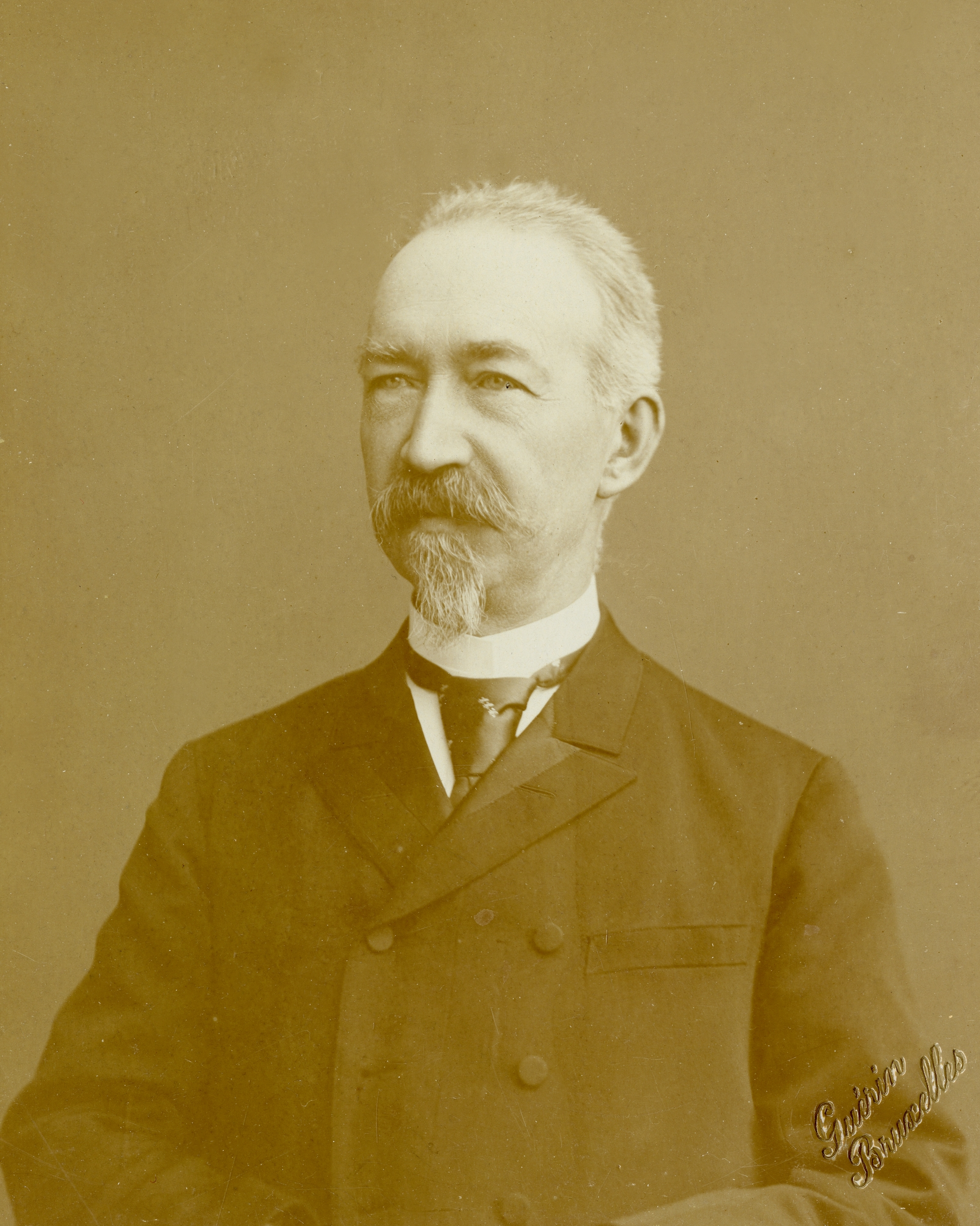
François Crépin

François Crépin (30 October 1830 – 30 April 1903) was a self-trained Belgian botanist who specialized in the roses. He worked as a director of the National Botanic Garden of Belgium.

Crépin was born in Rochefort, Belgium. One of five children he was born the son of a justice of peace. One brother became a physician and another a lawyer. He went to school in Wavreille and also received home tuitions from Romain Beaujean (1822–1906) who had an interest in natural history. He was introduced to the books Flore descriptive et analytique des environs de Paris by Ernest Cosson (1819–1889) and Ernest Germain (1814–1882) and Flore des environs de Spa by Alexandre-Louis-Simon Lejeune (1779–1858). He began to collect specimens of plants around Rochefort along with Beaujean. He began to work as a clerk from the late 1840s but quit work to pursue botany. He published on 50 species around 1859 and for some time he became a teacher of botany at Gentbrugge near Ghent. Crépin was encouraged by Barthélemy Dumortier (1797–1878), president of the Société royale de Botanique de Belgique. In 1869 he published a fascicule of his Primitiae monographiae Rosarum. In 1861 he received a job at the Ecole d’Horticulture at Gentbrugge to succeed a position made vacant by the death of M.J.F. Scheidweiler (1799–1861). During this period he collaborated with many botanists and he was made member of the board of the newly founded Société royale de Botanique de Belgique in 1862. He read Darwin's work but did not think it was applicable until a decade later. In 1870 he joined the Musée royal d’Histoire naturelle in Brussels where he began to study paleobotany. In 1876 he was appointed director of the State Botanic Garden (Jardin botanique de l’Etat) in Brussels. He worked there for 25 years continuing to study the genus Rosa. His personal herbarium consisted of 40,000 sheets and he donated them to the state botanical garden. He leaned taxonomically towards a conservative treatment of species and opposed excessive splitting. The genus Crepinella (Araliaceae) is named after him. As a taxonomist he circumscribed numerous plants within the genus Rosa. He died in Brussels.

His Belgian herbarium and his exsiccata-like series herbier des roses are kept in the collections of the Botanic Garden Meise.

== Honours ==
- 1872: Corresponding member of the Royal Academy of Science, Letters and Fine Arts of Belgium; full membership in 1875.

== Selected works ==
- Les Characées de Belgique, 1863 – Characeae native to Belgium.
- La nomenclature botanique au congrès international de botanique de Paris, 1867 – Botanical nomenclature of the International Congress of Botany of Paris.
- Description de deux roses et observations sur la classification du genre Rosa, 1868.
- Manuel de la flore de Belgique, (fifth edition 1884) – Manual of Belgian flora.
