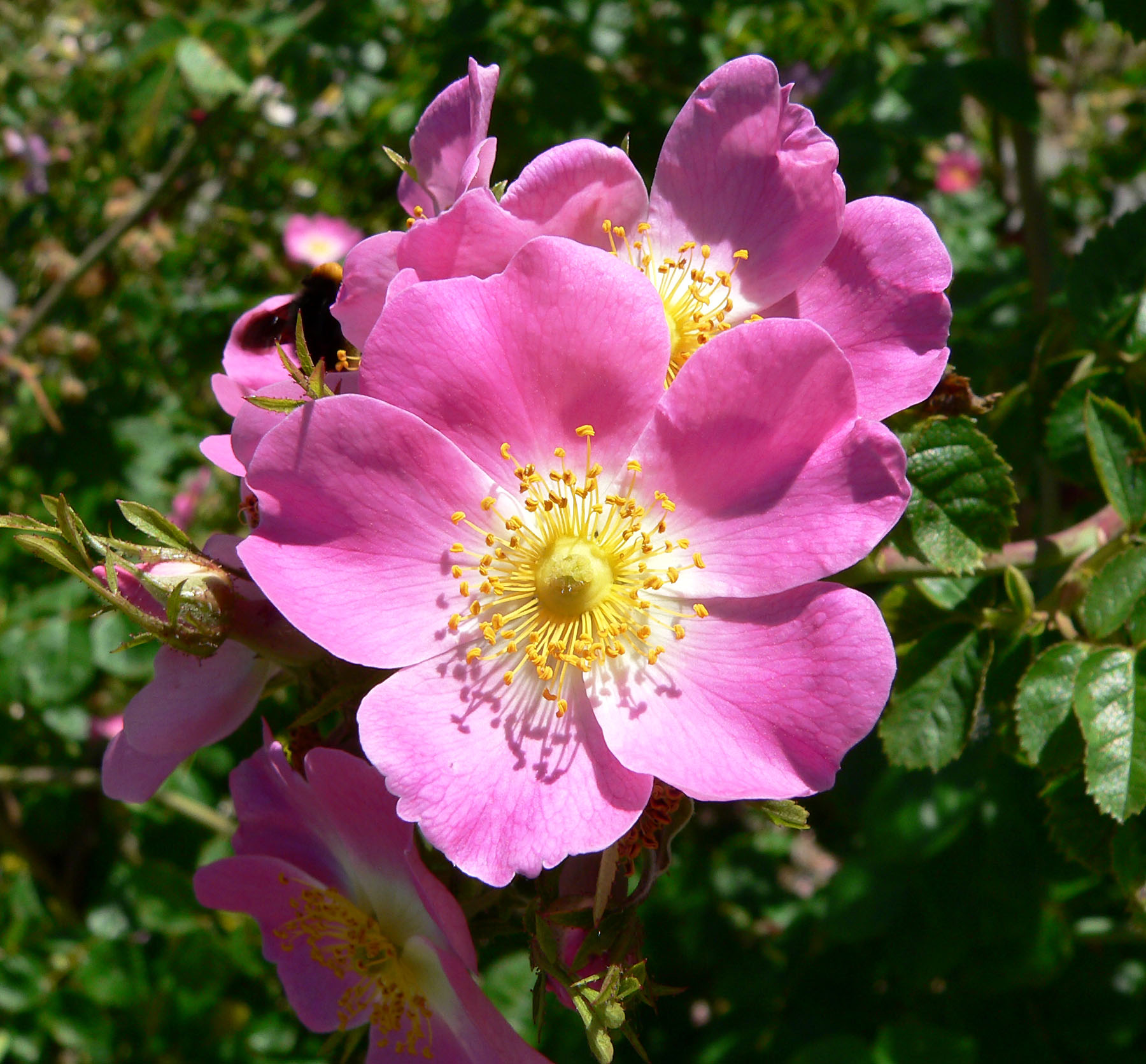
- Rosa rubiginosa, a wild rose native to Europe and West Asia
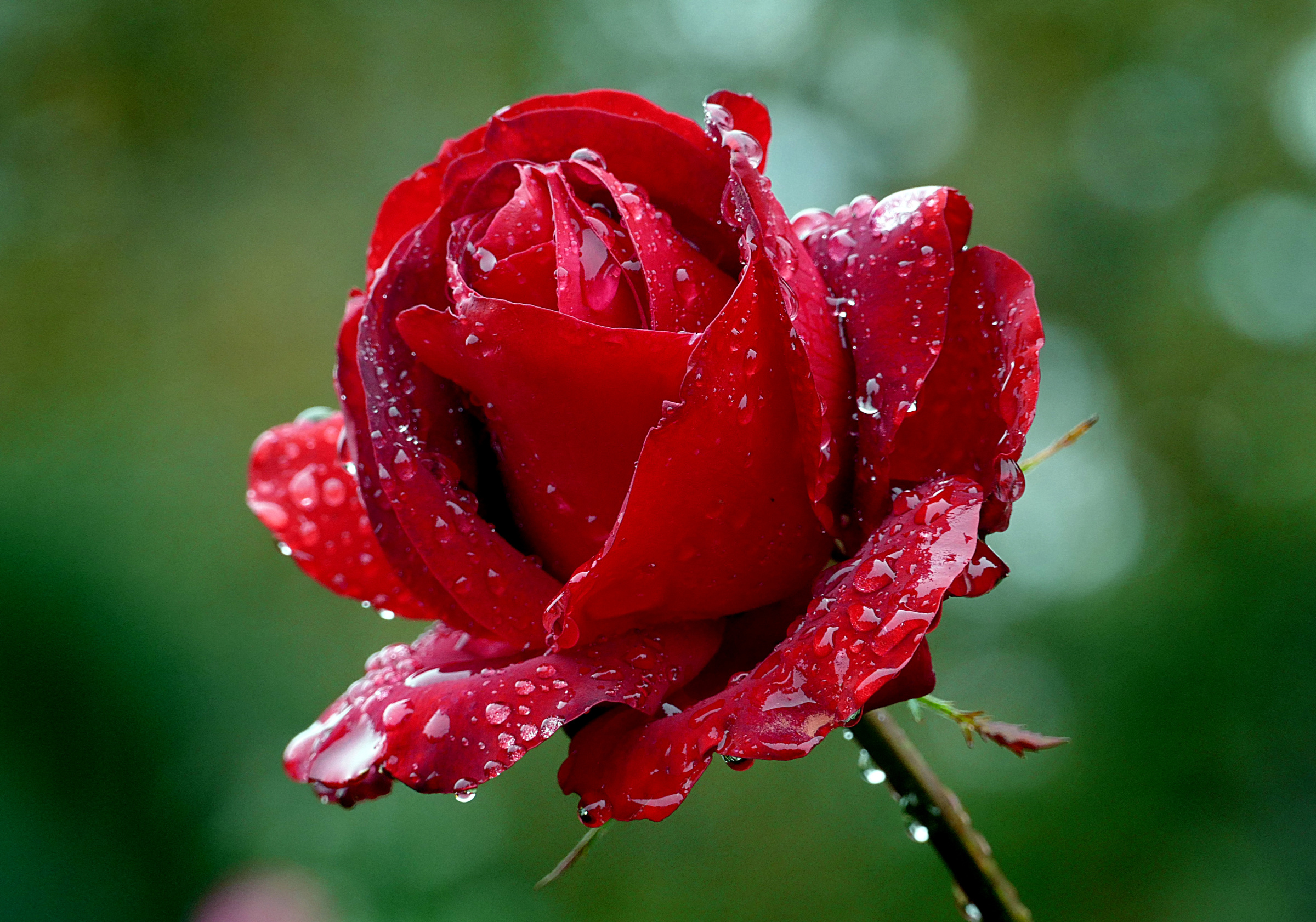
- Rosa 'Precious Platinum', a hybrid tea garden cultivar

Scientific classification
- Kingdom: Plantae
- Clade: Tracheophytes
- Clade: Angiosperms
- Clade: Eudicots
- Clade: Rosids
- Order: Rosales
- Family: Rosaceae
- Subfamily: Rosoideae
- Tribe: Roseae
- Genus: Rosa; L.

Type species
- Rosa cinnamomea L.

Species
- See List of Rosa species

Synonyms
- Bakeria (Gand.) Gand., nom. illeg.; Chabertia (Gand.) Gand.; Chavinia (Gand.) Gand.; Cottetia (Gand.) Gand.; Crepinia (Gand.) Gand., nom. illeg.; Ernestella Germ.; Hesperhodos Cockerell; Hulthemia Dumort.; × Hulthemosa Juz.; Juzepczukia Chrshan.; Laggeria (Gand.) Gand.; Lowea Lindl.; Ozanonia (Gand.) Gand.; Platyrhodon Decne. ex Hurst, nom. illeg.; Pugetia (Gand.) Gand.; Rhodophora Neck., nom. invalid.; Rhodopsis (Endl.) Rchb., nom. rejic.; Ripartia (Gand.) Gand.; Saintpierrea Germ.; Scheutzia (Gand.) Gand., nom. illeg.

= Rose =

Rose Temporal range: Eocene–Recent

Genus of flowering plants

A rose is either a woody perennial flowering plant of the genus Rosa (/ˈroʊzə/), in the family Rosaceae (/roʊˈzeɪsiː.iː/), or the flower it bears. There are over three hundred species and tens of thousands of cultivars. The plants range in size and form, from trailing and erect shrubs to climbers up to 7 metres (23 ft) in height. Sharp prickles appear on the stems of many species. Their flowers vary in size and shape and are usually large and showy, in colours ranging from white through pinks, reds, oranges and yellows.

Most species are native to Asia, with smaller numbers native to Europe, North America, and Northwest Africa. Species, cultivars and hybrids are all widely grown for their beauty and often are fragrant. Different species hybridize easily, and this has been used in the development of the wide range of garden roses. Roses have acquired cultural significance in many societies.

== Etymology ==
The name rose comes from Latin rosa, which was perhaps borrowed from Oscan, from Greek ῥόδον rhódon (Aeolic βρόδον wródon), itself borrowed from Old Persian wrd- (wurdi), related to Avestan varəδa, Sogdian ward, Parthian wâr.

== Botany ==
The leaves are borne alternately on the stem. In most species, they are 5 to 15 centimetres (2 to 6 in) long, pinnate, with (3–) 5–9 (−13) leaflets and basal stipules; the leaflets usually have a serrated margin, and often a few small prickles on the underside of the stem. Most roses are deciduous but a few (particularly from Southeast Asia) are evergreen or nearly so.

=== Thorns ===
The sharp growths along a rose stem, though commonly called "thorns", are technically prickles, outgrowths of the epidermis (the outer layer of tissue of the stem), unlike true thorns, which are modified stems. Rose prickles are typically sickle-shaped hooks, which aid the rose in hanging onto other vegetation when growing over it.

Some species such as Rosa rugosa and R. pimpinellifolia have densely packed straight prickles, probably an adaptation to reduce browsing by animals, but also possibly an adaptation to trap wind-blown sand and so reduce erosion and protect their roots (both of these species grow naturally on coastal sand dunes). Despite the presence of prickles, roses are frequently browsed by deer. A few species of roses have only vestigial prickles that have no points.

Plant geneticist Zachary Lippman of Cold Spring Harbor Laboratory found that prickles are controlled by the LOG gene. Blocking the LOG gene in roses reduced the thorns (large prickles) into tiny buds.

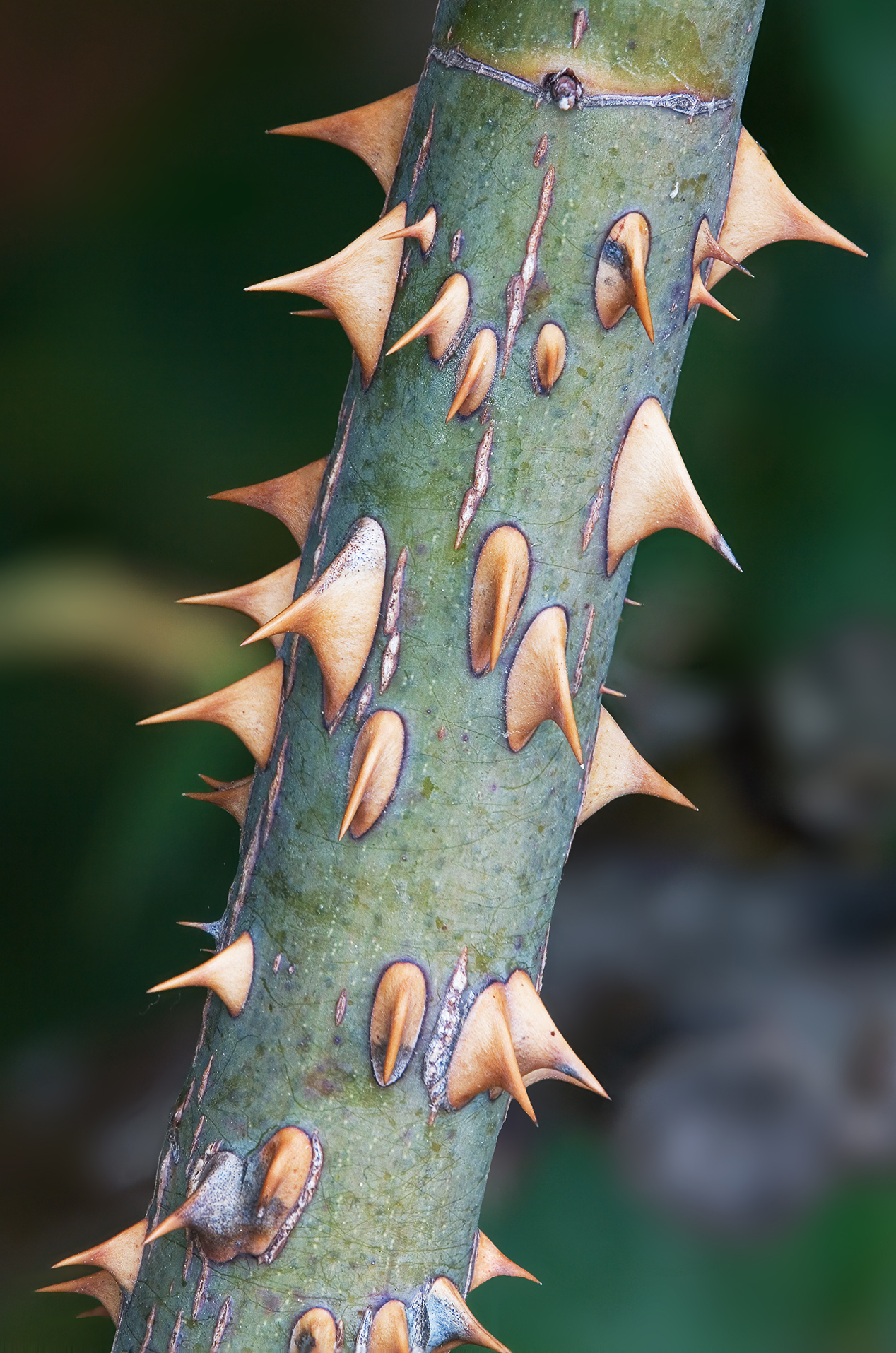
Rose thorns

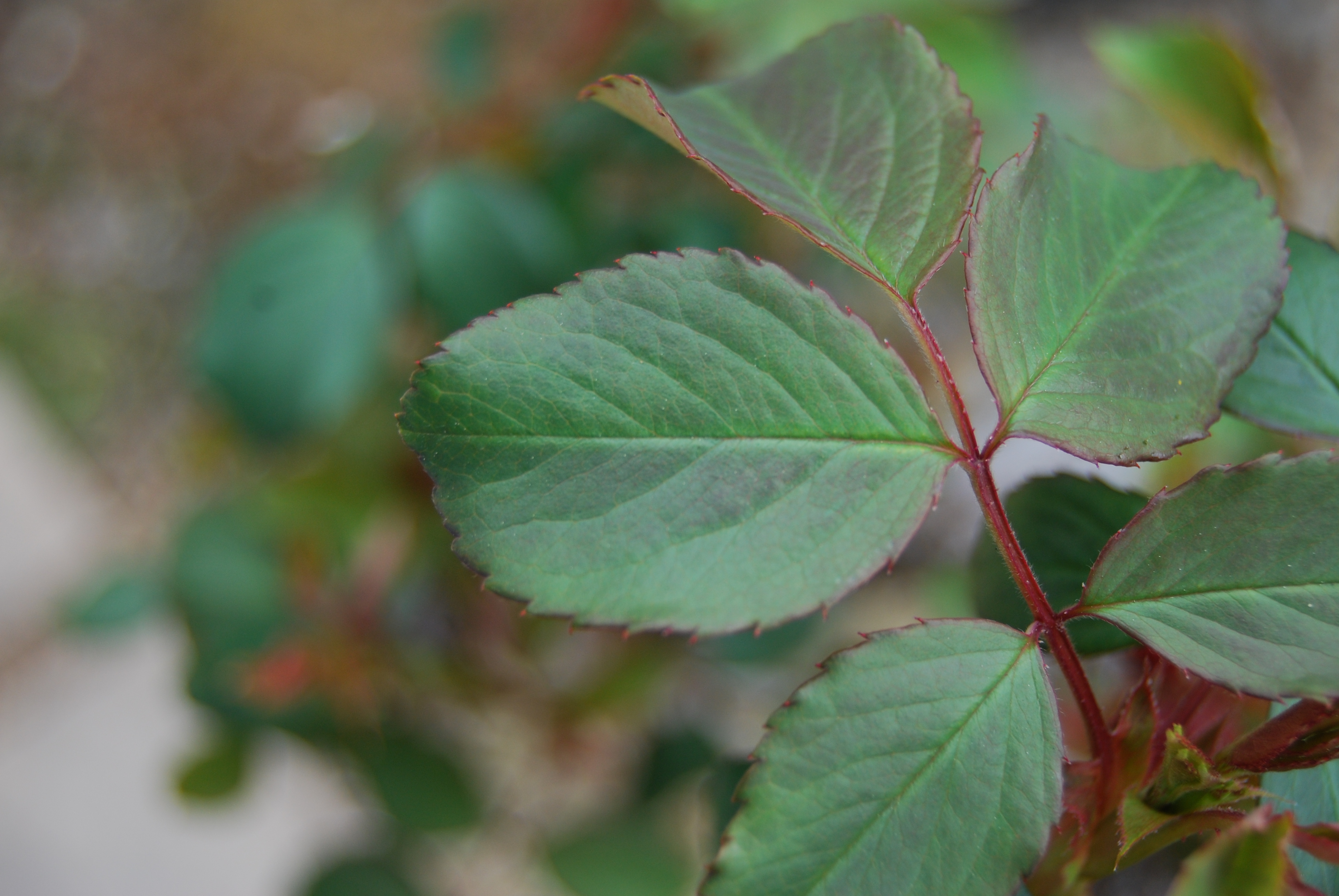
Rose leaflets

=== Flower ===
The flowers of most species have five petals, with the exception of Rosa omeiensis and Rosa sericea, which usually have only four. Each petal is divided into two distinct lobes and is usually white or pink, though in a few species yellow or red. Beneath the petals are five sepals (or in the case of some R. omeiensis and R. sericea, four). These may be long enough to be visible when viewed from above and appear as green points alternating with the rounded petals.

The coloured petals are fused on the axis and arranged in five bundles forming a circle, the petal bundles expand further from each other; the petals form a cup or disc surrounding the gynoecium. There are multiple superior ovaries that develop into achenes.

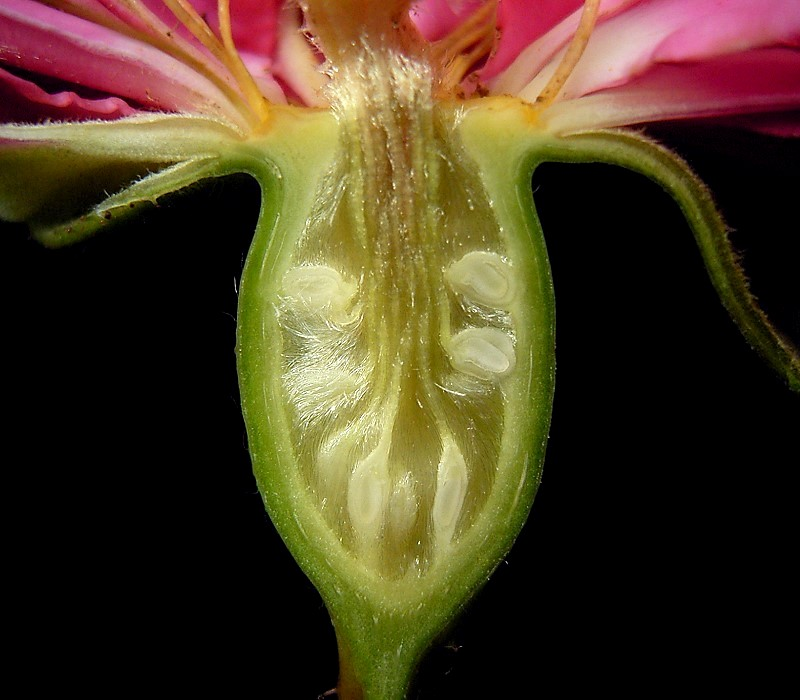
Longitudinal section of a developing rose hip

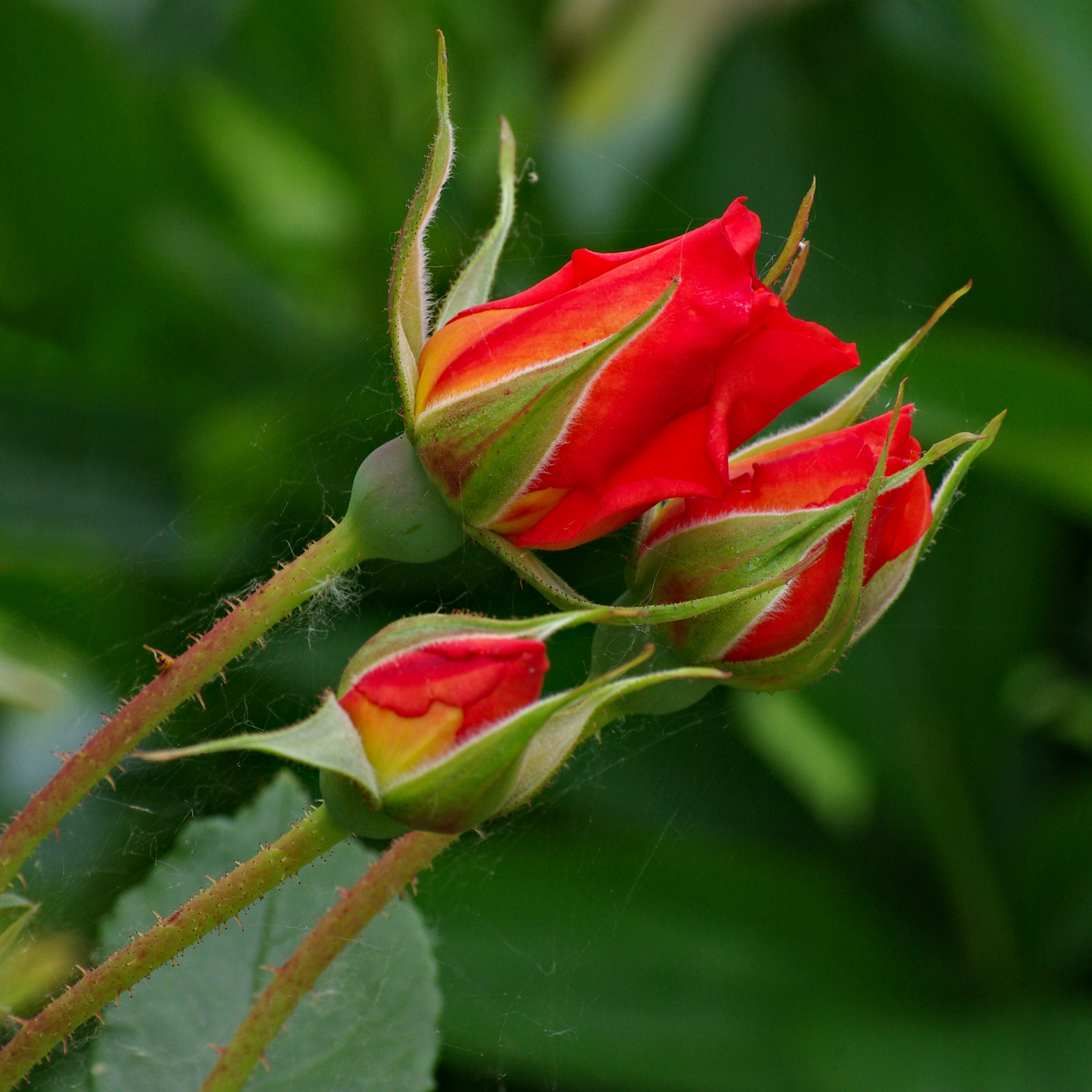
Exterior view of rose buds

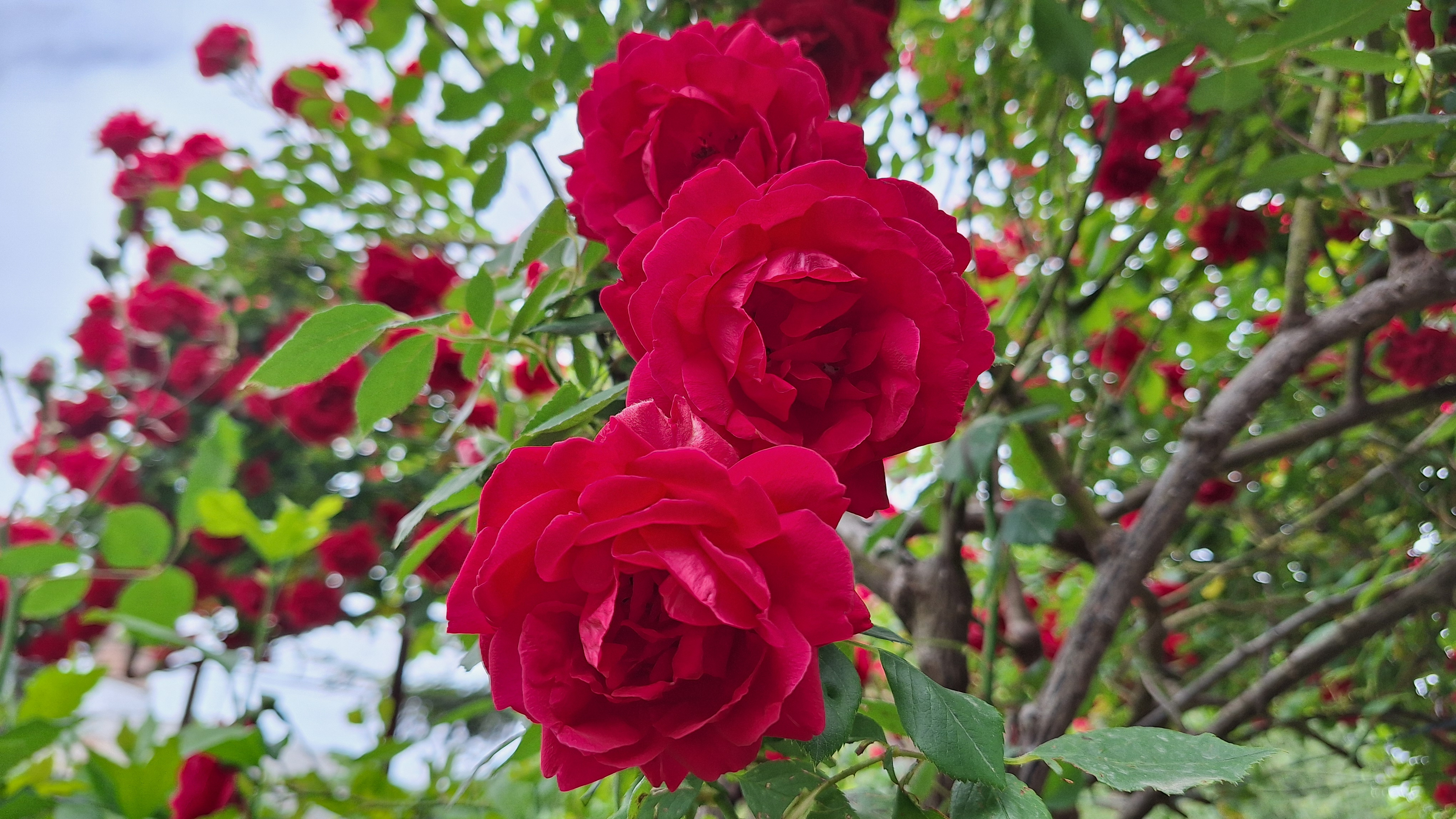
A close-up of a climbing rose

=== Reproduction ===
Roses are insect-pollinated in nature. A fertilized ovary forms a berry-like aggregate fruit called a "hip". The hips of most species are red, but a few (e.g. Rosa pimpinellifolia) have dark purple to black hips. Each hip comprises an outer fleshy layer, the hypanthium, which contains 5–160 "seeds" (technically dry single-seeded fruits called achenes) embedded in a matrix of fine, but stiff, hairs. Rose hips of some species, especially the dog rose (Rosa canina) and rugosa rose (R. rugosa), are very rich in vitamin C, among the richest sources of any plant. The hips are eaten by fruit-eating birds such as thrushes and waxwings, which then disperse the seeds in their droppings.

Many of the domestic cultivars do not produce hips, as the flowers are too tightly petalled to provide access for pollination and the plants can only propagate through human-made cuttings.

=== Evolution ===
The oldest remains of roses are from the Late Eocene Florissant Formation of Colorado. Roses were present in Europe by the early Oligocene.

Today's garden roses come from 18th-century China, via the imported Rosa chinensis. Among the old Chinese garden roses, the Old Blush group is the most primitive, while newer groups are the most diverse.

=== Genome ===
A study of the patterns of natural selection in the genome of roses indicated that genes related to DNA damage repair and stress adaptation have been positively selected, likely during their domestication. This rapid evolution may reflect an adaptation to genome confliction resulting from frequent intra- and inter-species hybridization and switching environmental conditions of growth.

=== Species ===
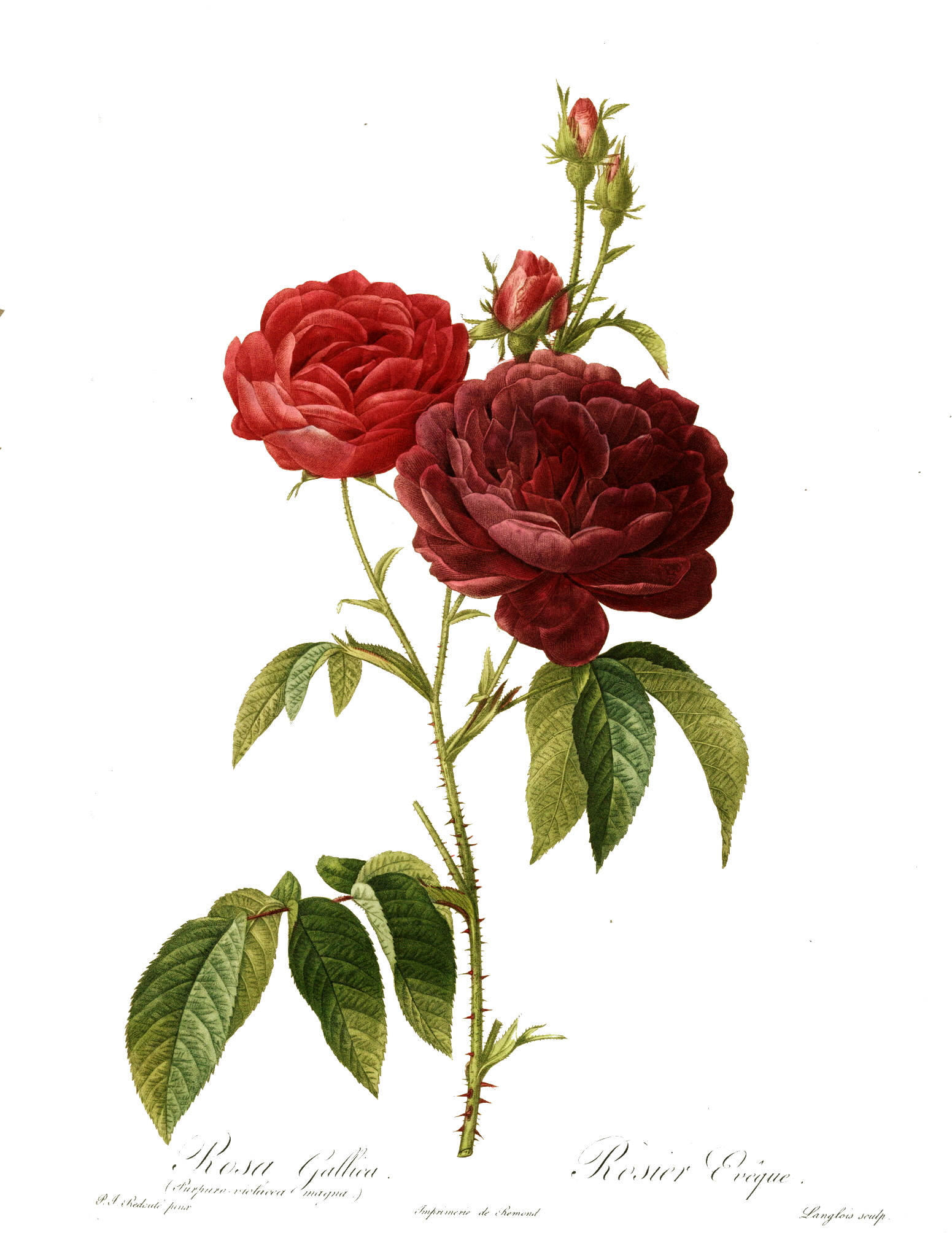
Rosa gallica 'Evêque', painted by Redouté

The genus Rosa is composed of 140–180 species and divided into four subgenera:

- Hulthemia (formerly Simplicifoliae, meaning "with single leaves") containing two species from Southwest Asia, Rosa persica and Rosa berberifolia, which are the only roses without compound leaves or stipules.
- Hesperrhodos (from the Greek for "western rose") contains Rosa minutifolia and Rosa stellata, from North America.
- Platyrhodon (from the Greek for "flaky rose", referring to flaky bark) with one species from east Asia, Rosa roxburghii (also known as the chestnut rose).
- Rosa (the type subgenus, sometimes incorrectly called Eurosa) containing all the other roses. This subgenus is subdivided into 11 sections.
  - Banksianae – white and yellow flowered roses from China.
  - Bracteatae – three species, two from China and one from India.
  - Caninae – pink and white flowered species from Asia, Europe and North Africa.
  - Carolinae – white, pink, and bright pink flowered species all from North America.
  - Chinensis – white, pink, yellow, red and mixed-colour roses from China and Burma.
  - Gallicanae – pink to crimson and striped flowered roses from western Asia and Europe.
  - Gymnocarpae – one species in western North America (Rosa gymnocarpa), others in east Asia.
  - Laevigatae – a single white flowered species from China.
  - Pimpinellifoliae – white, pink, bright yellow, mauve and striped roses from Asia and Europe.
  - Rosa (syn. sect. Cinnamomeae) – white, pink, lilac, mulberry and red roses from everywhere but North Africa.
  - Synstylae – white, pink, and crimson flowered roses from all areas.

== Ecology ==
Some birds, particularly finches, eat the seeds.

=== Pests and diseases ===
Wild roses are host plants for a number of pests and diseases. Many of these affect other plants, including other genera of the Rosaceae.

Cultivated roses are often subject to severe damage from insect, arachnid and fungal pests and diseases. In many cases they cannot be usefully grown without regular treatment to control these problems.

== Uses ==
Roses are best known as ornamental plants grown for their flowers in the garden and sometimes indoors. They have also been used for commercial perfumery and commercial cut flower crops. Some are used as landscape plants, for hedging and for other utilitarian purposes such as game cover and slope stabilization.

=== Ornamental plants ===
The majority of ornamental roses are hybrids that were bred for their flowers. A few, mostly species roses are grown for attractive or scented foliage (such as Rosa glauca and R. rubiginosa), ornamental thorns (such as R. sericea) or for their showy fruit (such as R. moyesii).

Ornamental roses have been cultivated for millennia, with the earliest known cultivation known to date from at least 500 BC in Mediterranean countries, Persia, and China. It is estimated that 30 to 35 thousand rose hybrids and cultivars have been bred and selected for garden use as flowering plants. Most are double-flowered with many or all of the stamens having morphed into additional petals.

In the early 19th century the Empress Josephine of France patronized the development of rose breeding at her gardens at Malmaison. As long ago as 1840 a collection numbering over one thousand different cultivars, varieties and species was possible when a rosarium was planted by Loddiges nursery for Abney Park Cemetery, an early Victorian garden cemetery and arboretum in England.

=== Cut flowers ===
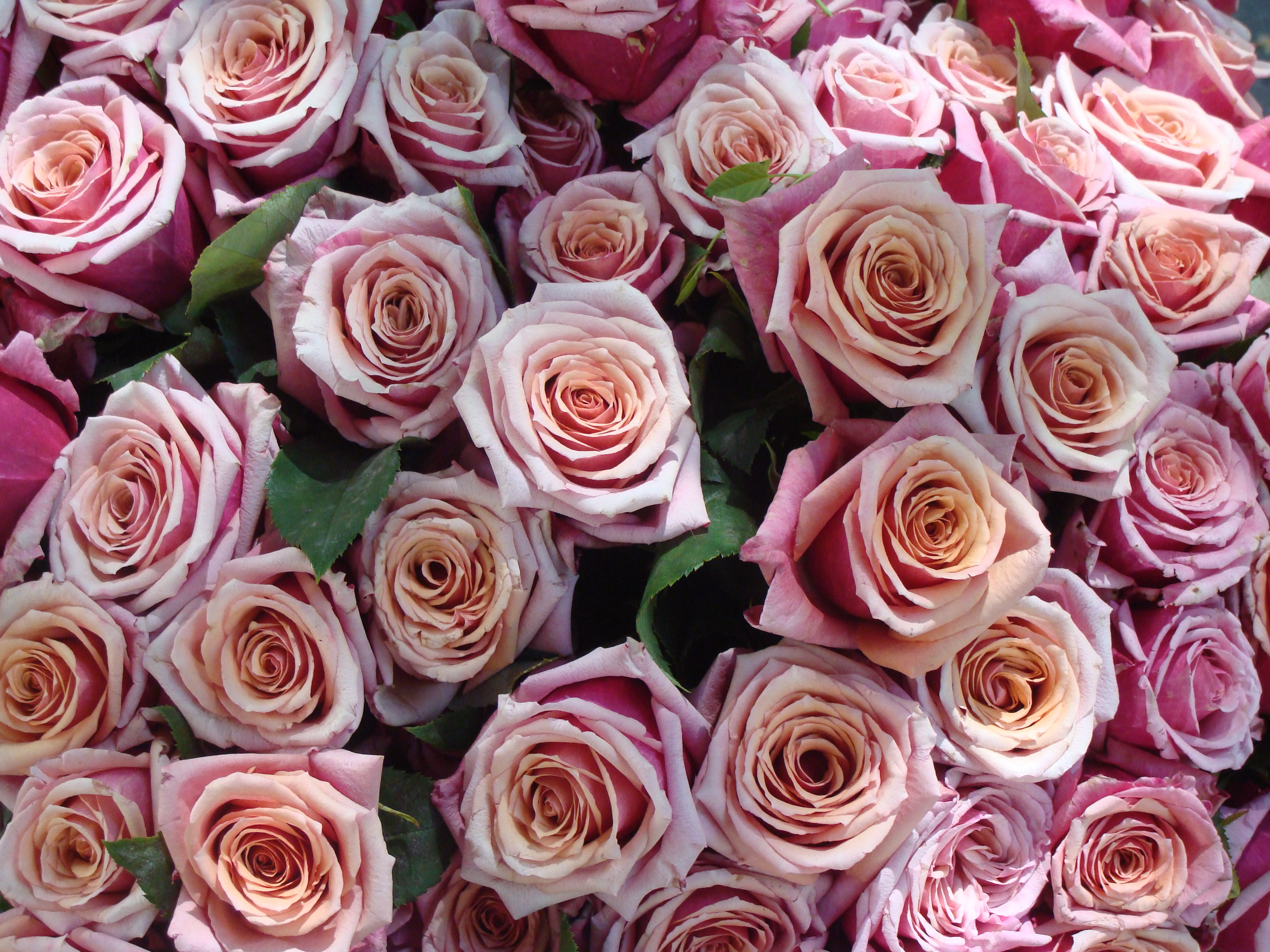
Bouquet of pink roses

Roses are a popular crop for both domestic and commercial cut flowers. Generally they are harvested and cut when in bud, and held in refrigerated conditions until ready for display at their point of sale. The price of the roses depends partly on the characteristics of the rose itself, such as how long the stem is and how big the bloom is, and partly on factors about how it was grown, such as which country it was grown in.

In temperate climates, cut roses are often grown in greenhouses, and in warmer countries they may also be grown under cover in order to ensure that the flowers are not damaged by weather and that pest and disease control can be carried out effectively. Significant quantities are grown in some tropical countries, and these are shipped by air to markets across the world.

Some kind of roses are artificially coloured using dyed water, like rainbow roses.

=== Perfume ===
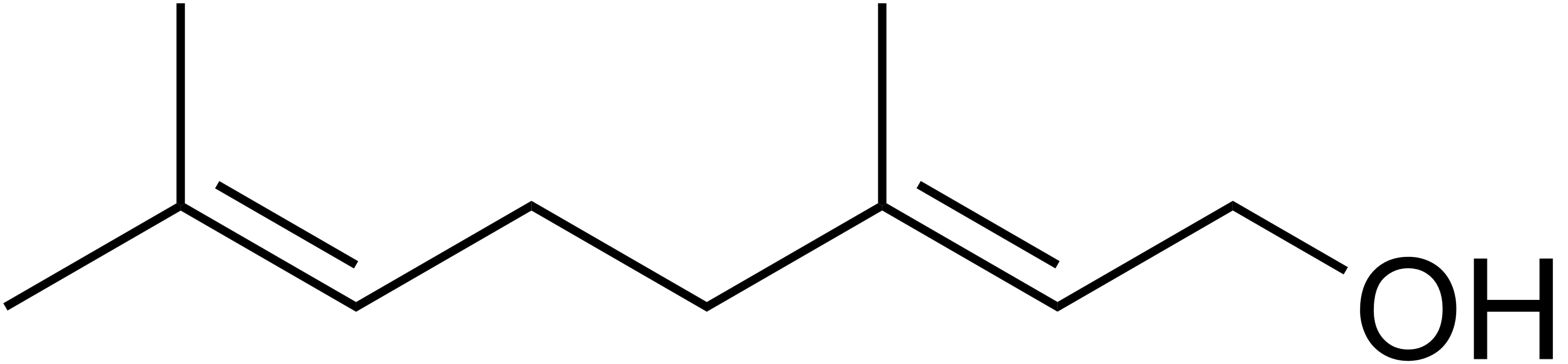
Geraniol (C_{10}H_{18}O)

Rose perfumes are made from rose oil (also called attar of roses), which is a mixture of volatile essential oils obtained by steam distilling the crushed petals of roses. An associated product is rose water which is used for cooking, cosmetics, medicine and religious practices. The production technique originated in Persia and then spread through Arabia and India, and more recently into eastern Europe. In Bulgaria, Iran and Germany, damask roses (Rosa × damascena 'Trigintipetala') are used. In other parts of the world Rosa × centifolia is commonly used. The oil is transparent pale yellow or yellow-grey in colour. 'Rose Absolute' is solvent-extracted with hexane and produces a darker oil, dark yellow to orange in colour. The weight of oil extracted is about one three-thousandth to one six-thousandth of the weight of the flowers; for example, about two thousand flowers are required to produce one gram of oil.

The main constituents of attar of roses are the fragrant alcohols geraniol and L-citronellol and rose camphor, an odorless solid composed of alkanes, which separates from rose oil. β-Damascenone is also a significant contributor to the scent.

=== Food and drink ===
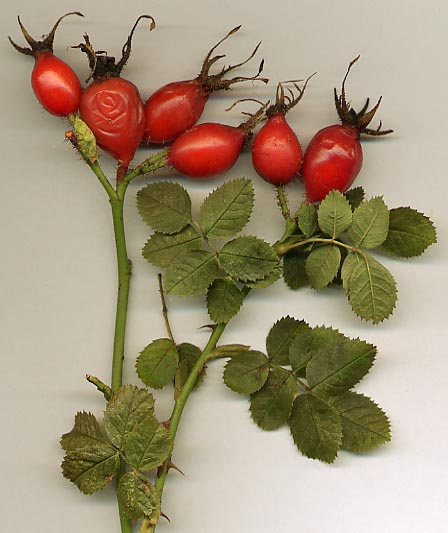
Rosa rubiginosa hips

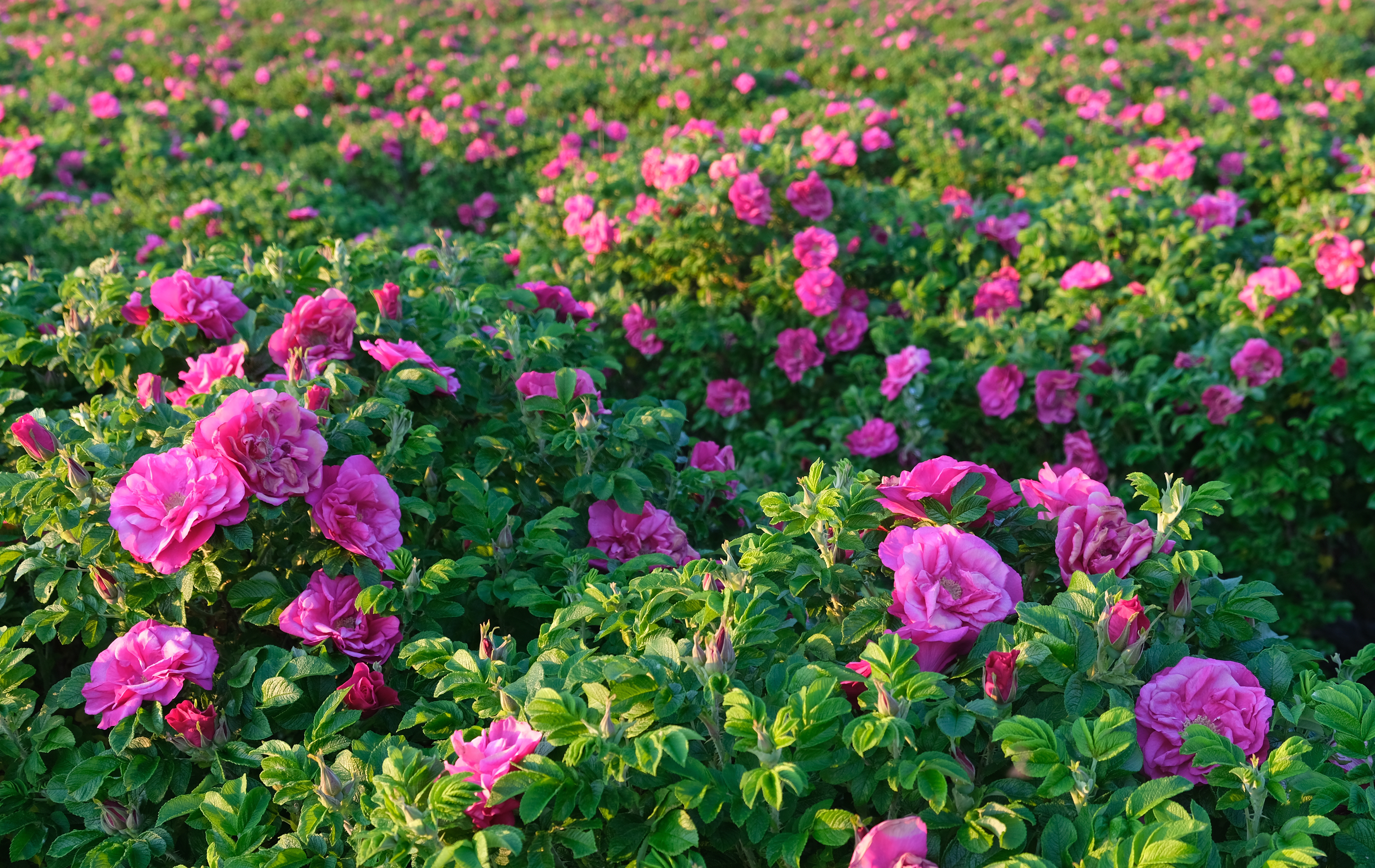
Farming of Rosa rugosa

Rose hips, usually from R. canina, are high in vitamin C, and are edible raw after the removal of the irritant hairs. Hips can be made into jam, jelly, marmalade, and soup, or brewed for tea. They are also pressed and filtered to make rose hip syrup. Rose hips are also used to produce rose hip seed oil, which is used in skin products and some makeup products. Diarrhodon (Gr διάρροδον, "compound of roses", from ῥόδων, "of roses") is the historic name for various compounds in which red roses are an ingredient.

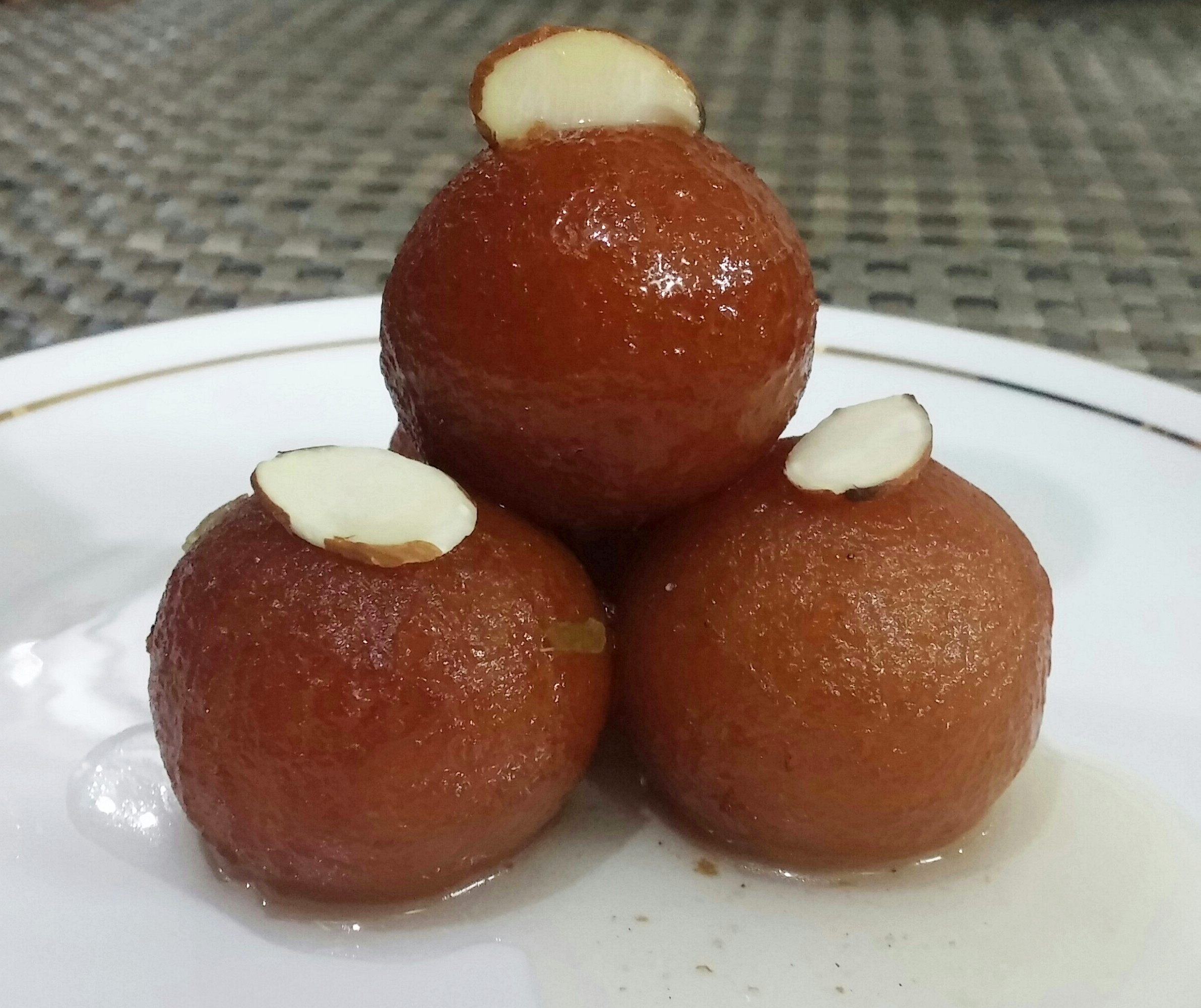
Gulab jamun made with rose water

Rose water has a very distinctive flavour and is used in Middle Eastern, Persian, and South Asian cuisine—especially in sweets such as Turkish delight, barfi, baklava, halva, gulab jamun, knafeh, and nougat. Rose petals or flower buds are sometimes used to flavour ordinary tea, or combined with other herbs to make herbal teas. A sweet preserve of rose petals called gulkand is common in the Indian subcontinent. The leaves and washed roots are also sometimes used to make tea.

In France, there is much use of rose syrup, most commonly made from an extract of rose petals. In the Indian subcontinent, Rooh Afza, a concentrated squash made with roses, is popular, as are rose-flavoured frozen desserts such as ice cream and kulfi.

The flower stems and young shoots are edible, as are the petals (sans the white or green bases). The latter are usually used as flavouring or to add their scent to food. Other minor uses include candied rose petals.

Rose creams (rose-flavoured fondant covered in chocolate, often topped with a crystallised rose petal) are a traditional English confectionery widely available from numerous producers in the UK.

Under the American Federal Food, Drug, and Cosmetic Act, there are only certain Rosa species, varieties, and parts are listed as generally recognized as safe (GRAS).

- Rose absolute: Rosa alba L., Rosa centifolia L., Rosa damascena Mill., Rosa gallica L., and vars. of these spp.
- Rose (otto of roses, attar of roses): Ditto
- Rose buds
- Rose flowers
- Rose fruit (hips)
- Rose leaves: Rosa spp.

== Art and symbolism ==
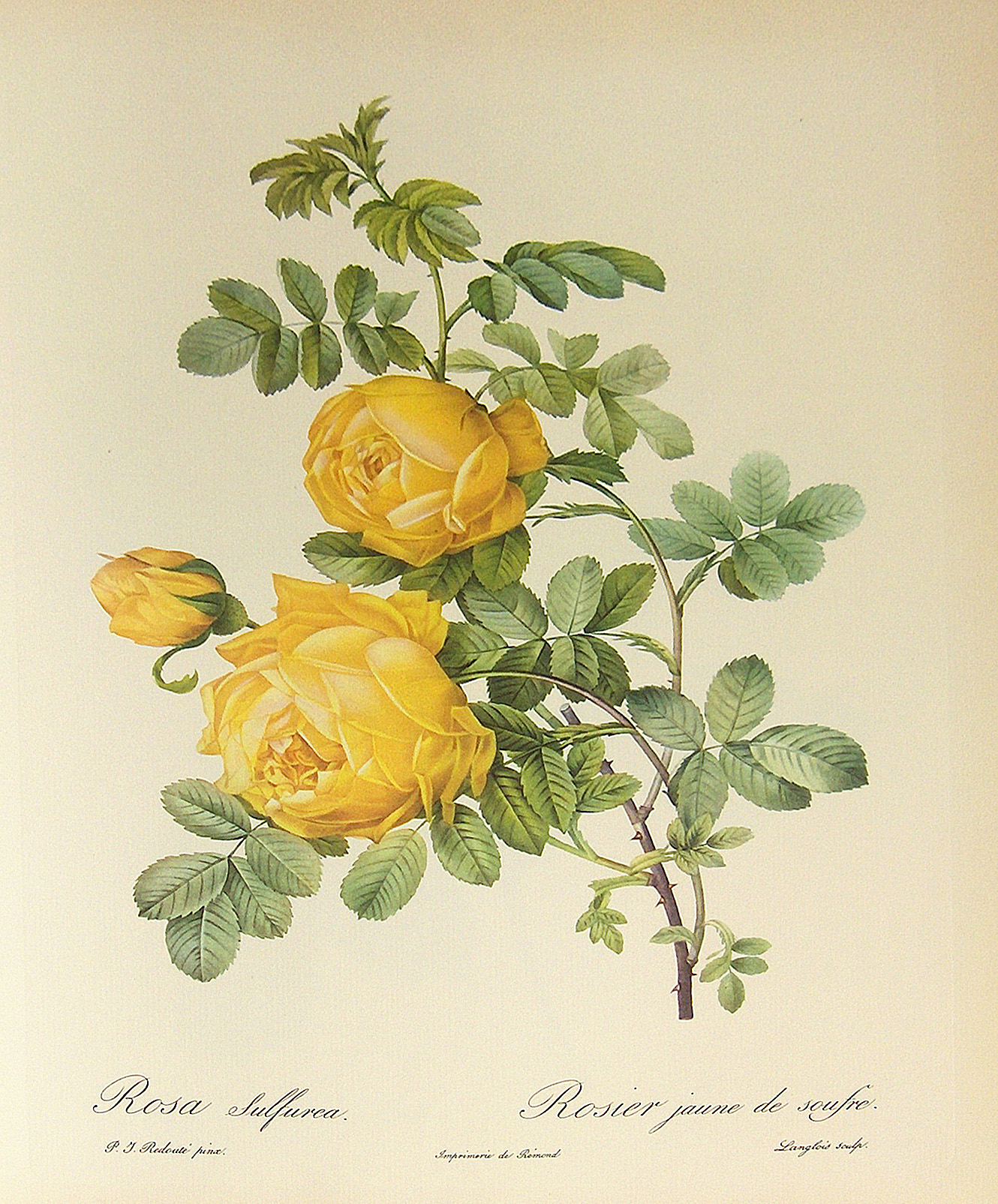
Rosa hemisphaerica (syn.: R. sulphurea), watercolor by Pierre-Joseph Redouté (1759–1840)

The long cultural history of the rose has led to it being used often as a symbol. In ancient Greece, the rose was closely associated with the goddess Aphrodite. In the Iliad, Aphrodite protects the body of Hector using the "immortal oil of the rose" and the archaic Greek lyric poet Ibycus praises a beautiful youth saying that Aphrodite nursed him "among rose blossoms". The second-century AD Greek travel writer Pausanias associates the rose with the story of Adonis and states that the rose is red because Aphrodite wounded herself on one of its thorns and stained the flower red with her blood. Book Eleven of the ancient Roman novel The Golden Ass by Apuleius contains a scene in which the goddess Isis, who is identified with Venus, instructs the main character, Lucius, who has been transformed into a donkey, to eat rose petals from a crown of roses worn by a priest as part of a religious procession in order to regain his humanity. French writer René Rapin invented a myth in which a beautiful Corinthian queen named Rhodanthe ("she with rose flowers") was besieged inside a temple of Artemis by three ardent suitors who wished to worship her as a goddess; the god Apollo then transformed her into a rosebush.

Following the Christianization of the Roman Empire, the rose became identified with the Virgin Mary. The colour of the rose and the number of roses received has symbolic representation. The rose symbol eventually led to the creation of the rosary and other devotional prayers in Christianity. The Rose Cross incorporates the flower directly into the Christian cross, and is the namesake of the esoteric religious order of Rosicrucianism.

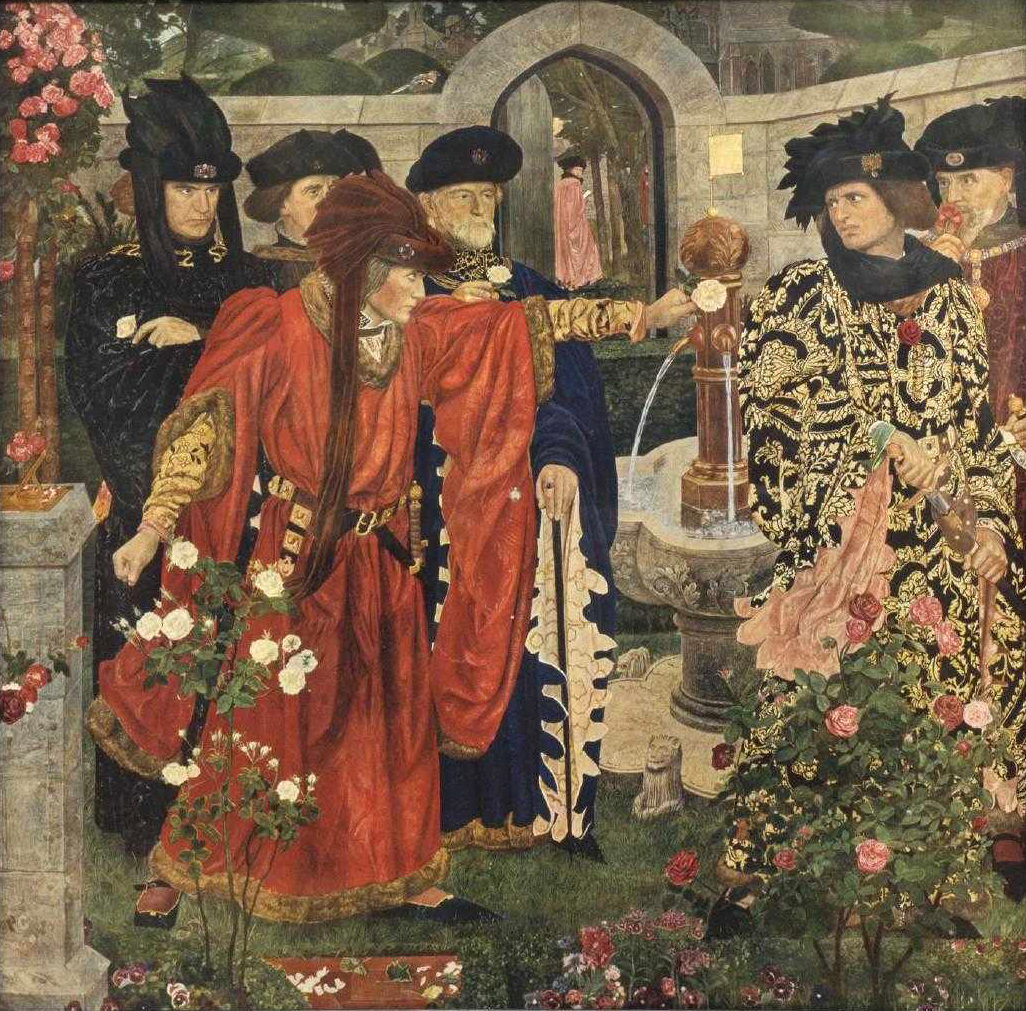
Framed print after 1908 painting by Henry Payne of the scene in the Temple Garden, where supporters of the rival factions in the Wars of the Roses pick either red or white roses

Ever since the 1400s, the Franciscans have had a Crown Rosary of the Seven Joys of the Blessed Virgin Mary. In the 1400s and 1500s, the Carthusians promoted the idea of sacred mysteries associated with the rose symbol and rose gardens. Albrecht Dürer's painting The Feast of the Rosary (1506) depicts the Virgin Mary distributing garlands of roses to her devotees.

Roses symbolised the Houses of York and Lancaster in a conflict known as the Wars of the Roses. Subsequently, roses of the corresponding colours have been used as emblems for the English counties of Yorkshire and Lancashire.

The Tudor rose combines the colours of the roses of York and Lancaster, and is an emblem of then Tudor dynasty and of England.

Roses are a favored subject in art and appear in portraits, illustrations, on stamps, as ornaments or as architectural elements. The Luxembourg-born Belgian artist and botanist Pierre-Joseph Redouté is known for his detailed watercolours of flowers, particularly roses. Indeed, when it comes to cultivation of the rose, Luxembourg has a rich past and present.

Henri Fantin-Latour was also a prolific painter of still life, particularly flowers including roses. The rose 'Fantin-Latour' was named after the artist.

Other impressionists including Claude Monet, Paul Cézanne and Pierre-Auguste Renoir have paintings of roses among their works. In the 19th century, for example, artists associated the city of Trieste with a certain rare white rose, and this rose developed as the city's symbol. It was not until 2021 that the rose, which was believed to be extinct, was rediscovered there.

In 1986 President Ronald Reagan signed legislation to make the rose the floral emblem of the United States. It is also the national flower of Luxembourg.

The rose is often exchanged on St. Valentines Day and is used often as a symbol of such.

The term bara (薔薇), "rose" in Japanese, has historically been used in Japan as a pejorative for men who love men, roughly equivalent to the English language term "pansy". Beginning in the 1960s, the term was reappropriated by Japanese gay media: notably with the 1961 anthology Ba-ra-kei: Ordeal by Roses, a collection of semi-nude photographs of homosexual writer Yukio Mishima by photographer Eikoh Hosoe, and later with Barazoku (薔薇族; lit. "rose tribe") in 1971, the first commercially produced gay magazine in Asia. The use of the rose as a prominent symbol of love between males is supposedly derived from the Greek myth of King Laius having affairs with boys under rose trees. Since the 2000s, bara has been used by non-Japanese audience as an umbrella term to describe a wide variety of Japanese and non-Japanese gay media featuring love and sex between masculine men. The rose is also the sacred flower of Eros, the Greek god of love and sex, and patron of love between men. Eros was responsible for the first rose to sprout on Earth, followed by every flower and herb. Roses are a symbol of pederasty in ancient Greece: handsome boys were metaphorically called roses by their male admirers in homoerotic poems such as those by Solon, Straton, Meleager, Rhianus, and Philostratos.

As opposed to the red rose and its association with romantic affection, giving someone a yellow rose is symbolic of platonic love. Because of this, yellow roses have also become popular as symbols of aromantic people.

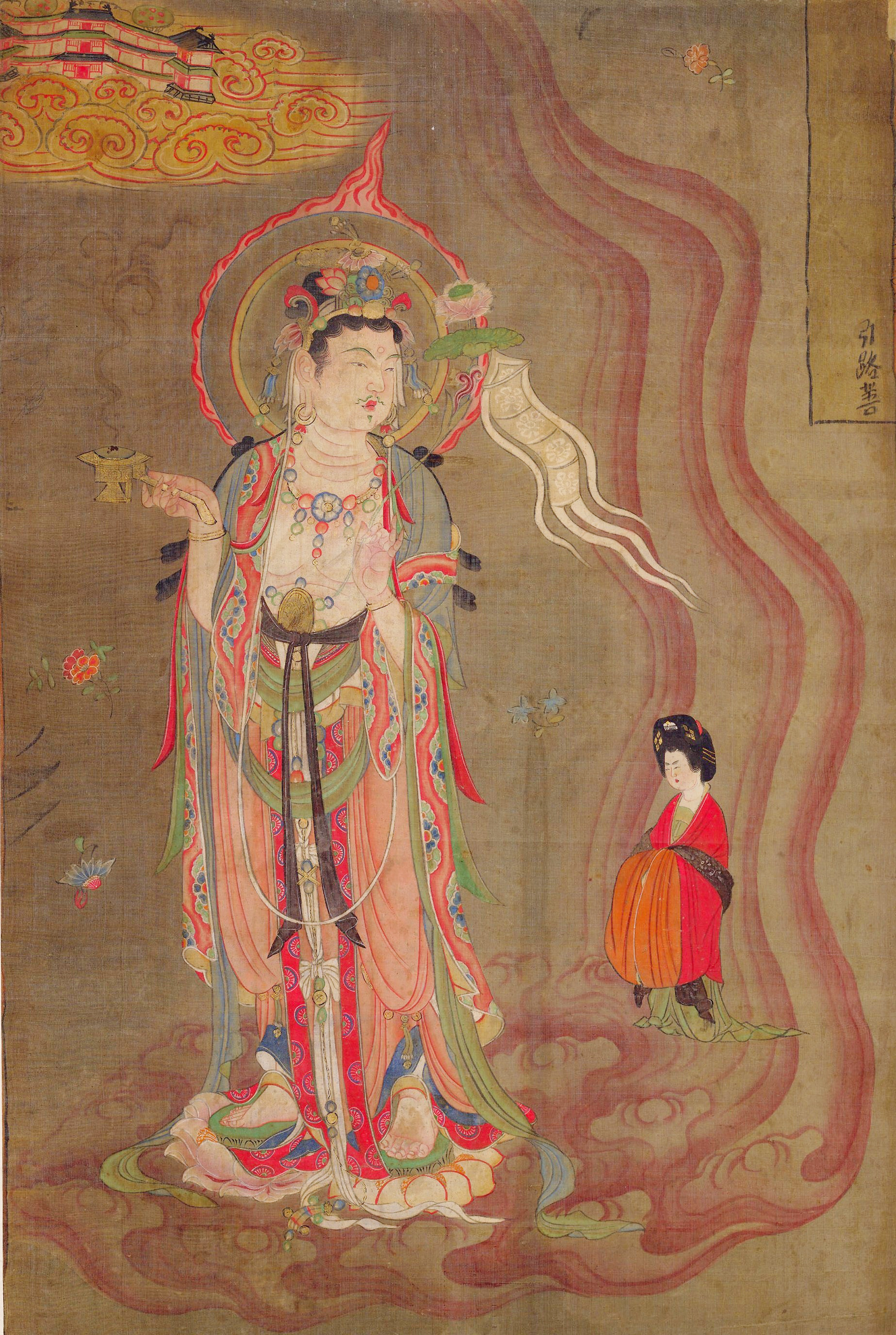
Avalokiteśvara as Guide of Souls (late 9th c.) with a rose twig on the left

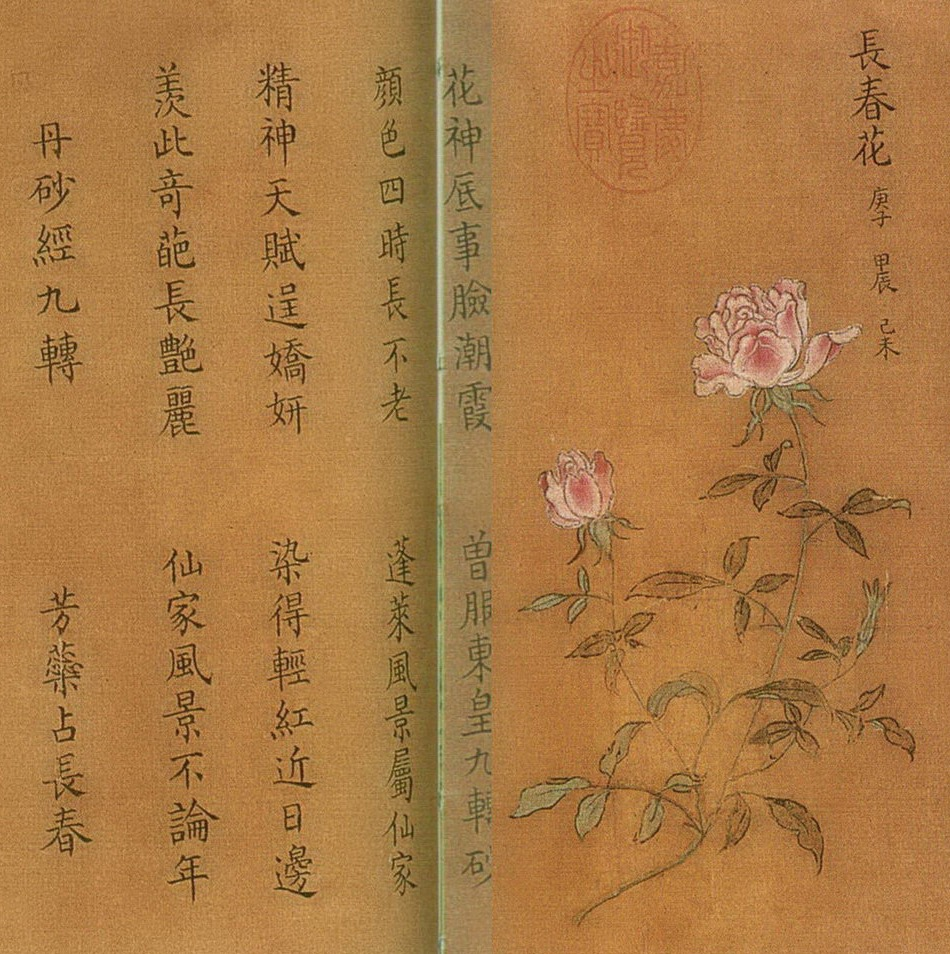
13th-century Chinese painting of Rosa chinensis 'Old Blush'

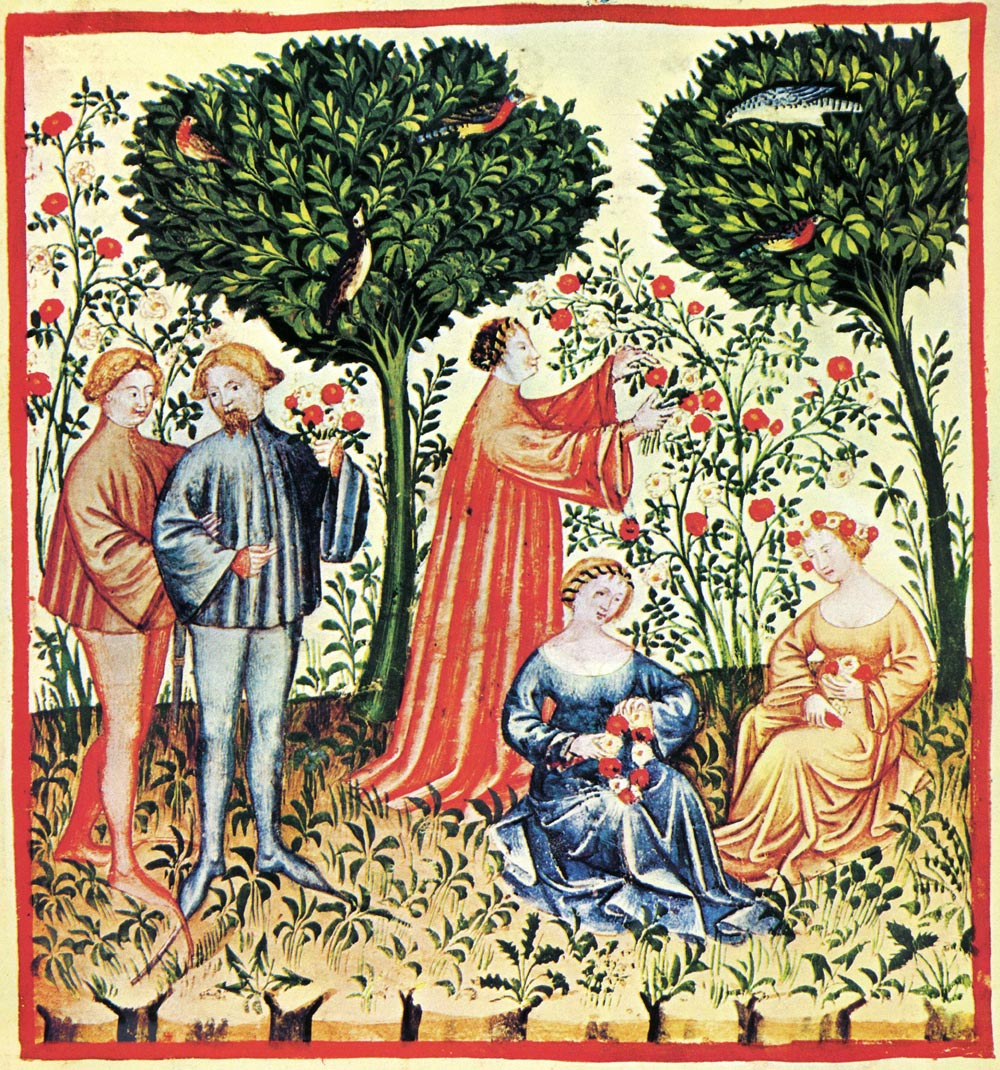
Illustration of roses from a 14th-century edition of Tacuinum Sanitatis

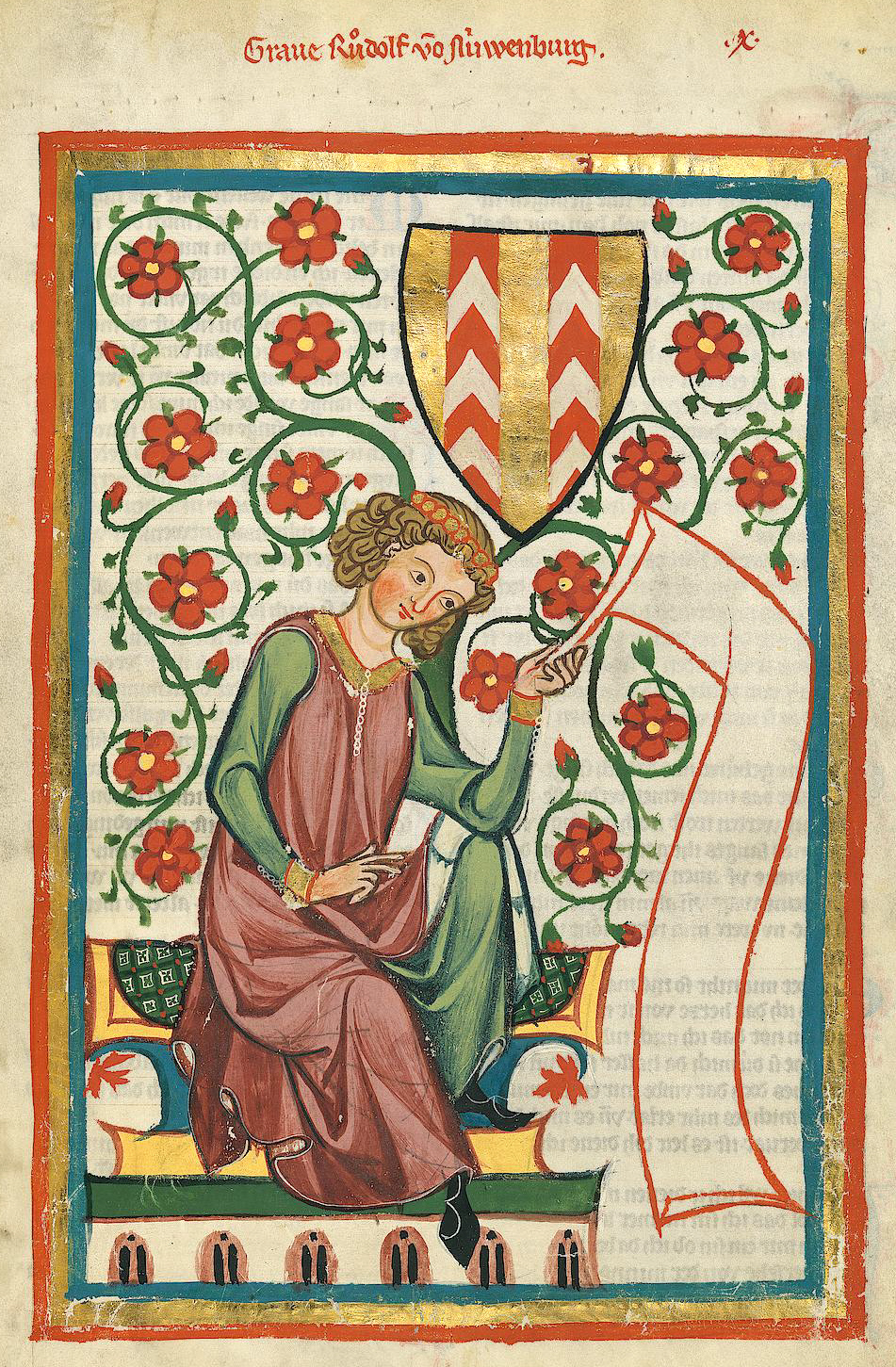
Codex Manesse illuminated with roses, illustrated between 1305 and 1340 in Zürich. It contains love songs in Middle High German

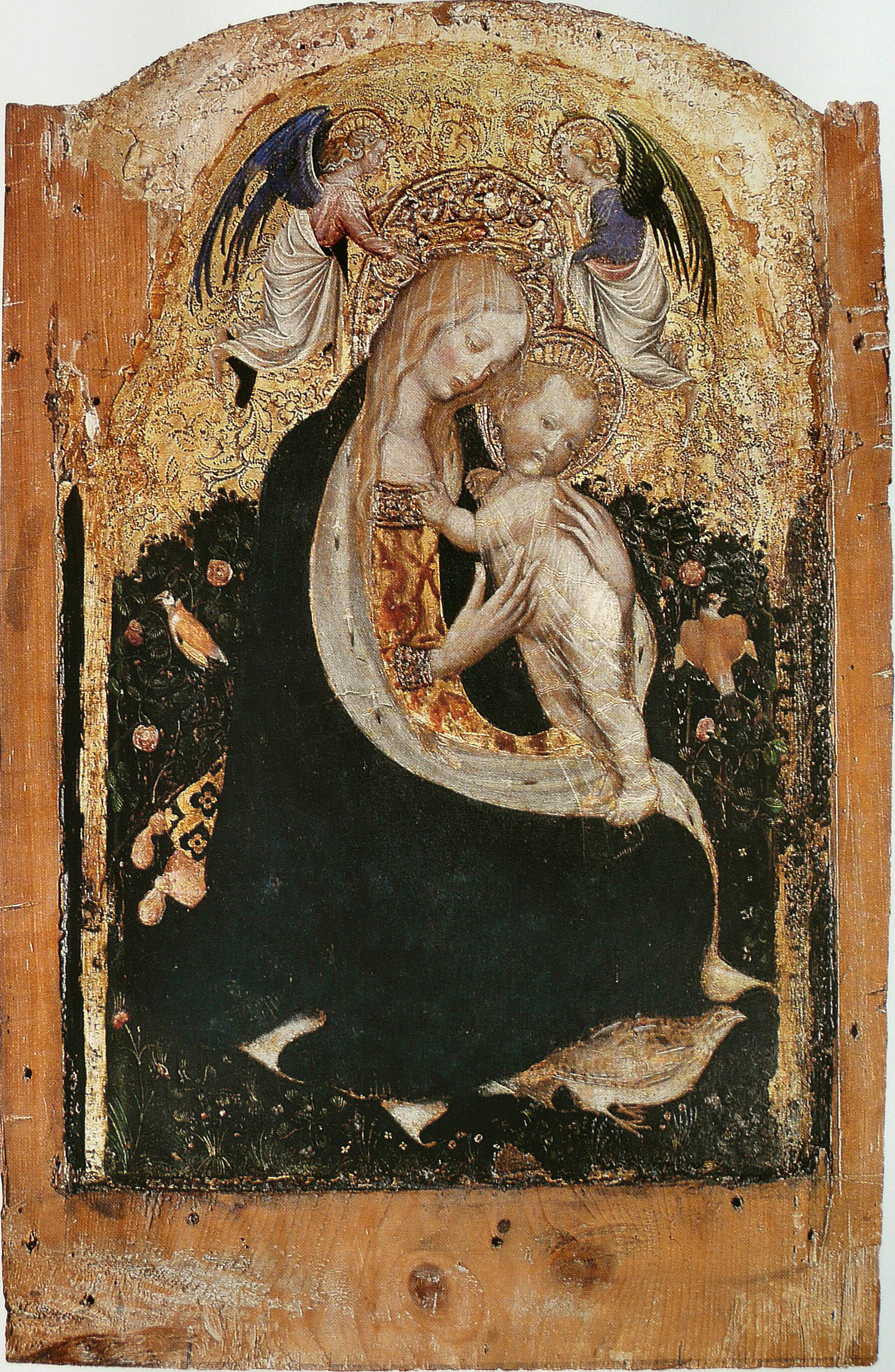
Madonna of the Quail (c. 1420) with roses in the background

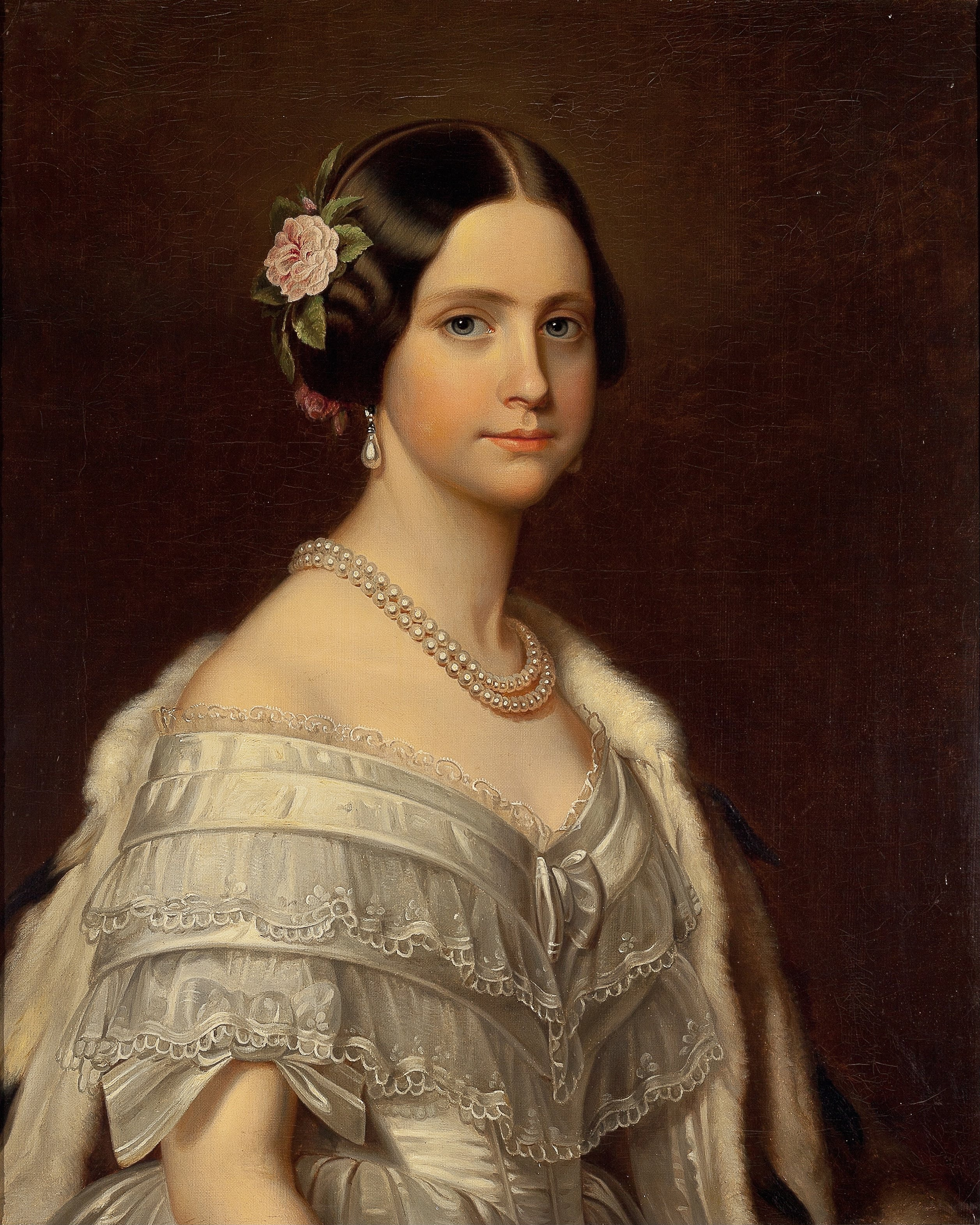
Princess Maria Amélia of Brazil with a rose in her hair (1849)

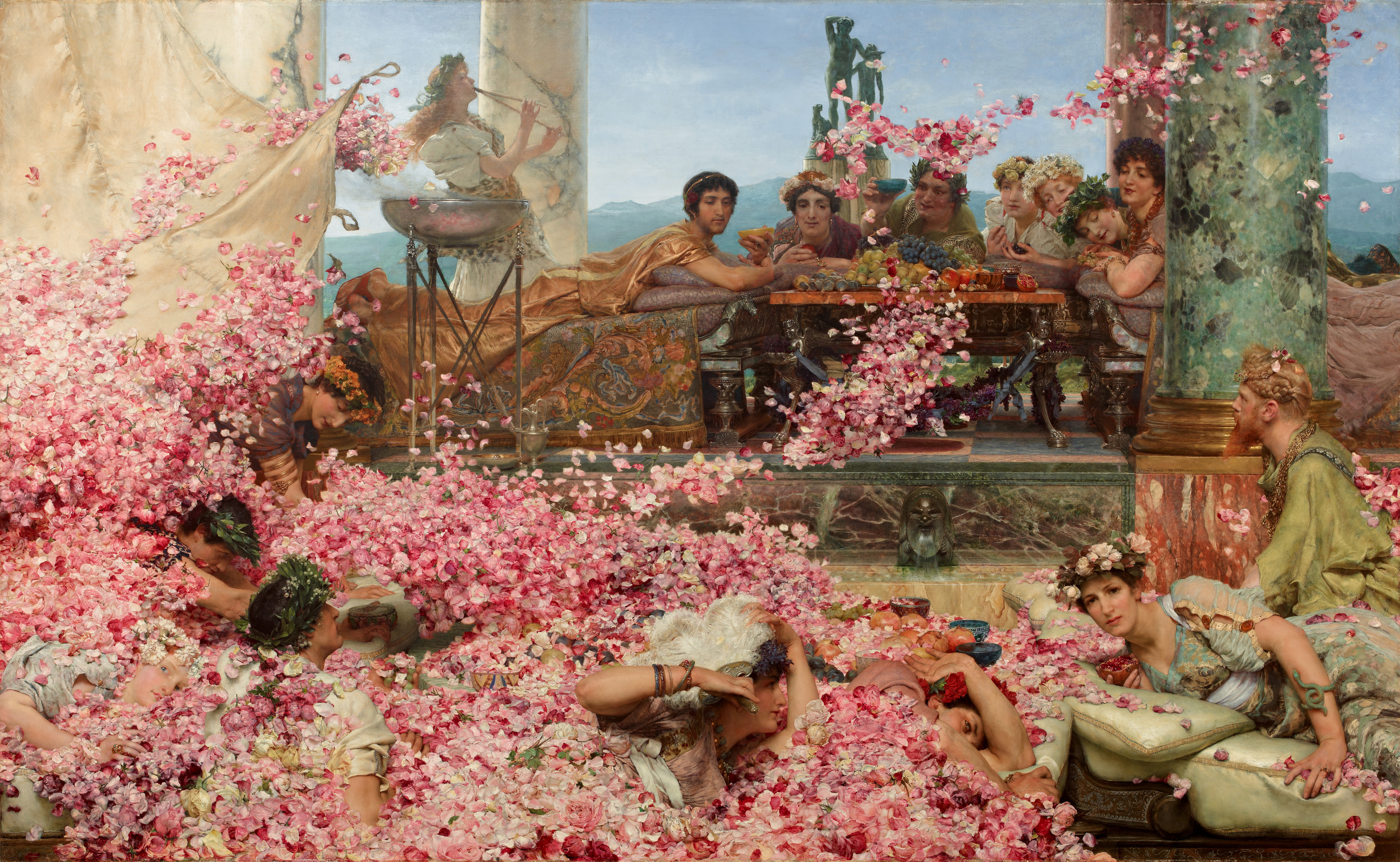
The Roses of Heliogabalus by Alma-Tadema (1888)

White rose pictured in the coat of arms of Viljandi

The Tudor rose is a combination of the red rose of Lancaster and the white rose of York

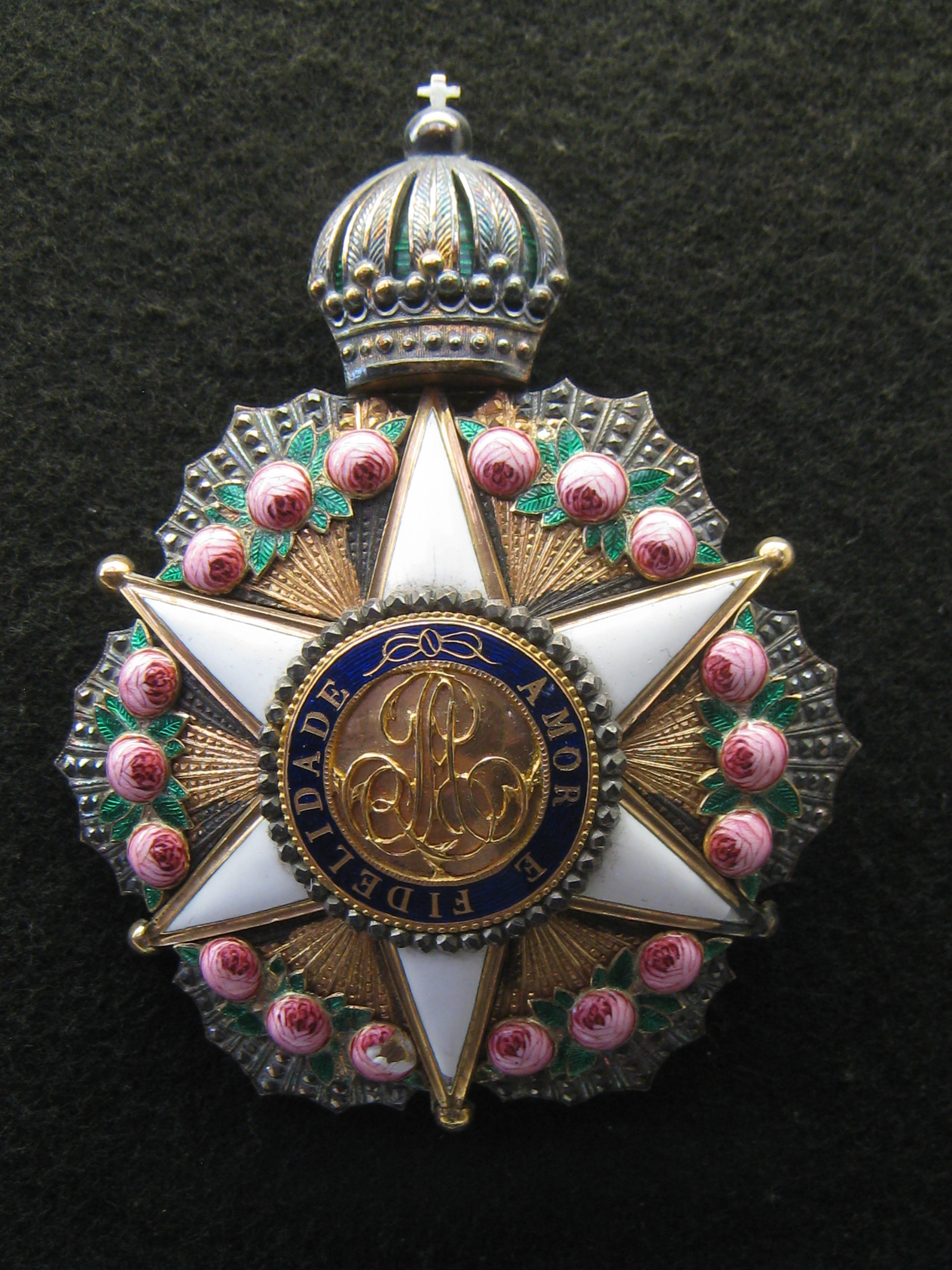
Insignia of the Brazilian Order of the Rose

Botanical print of Rosa semperflorens (y.) minima also known as Miss Lawrence’s Rose, from the Curtis's Botanical Magazine, 1815, from an illustration by J. Curtis.

== See also ==
- ADR rose
- List of Award of Garden Merit roses
- List of rose cultivars named after people
- Rose (colour)
- Rose garden
- Rose Hall of Fame
- Rose show
- Rose trial grounds
