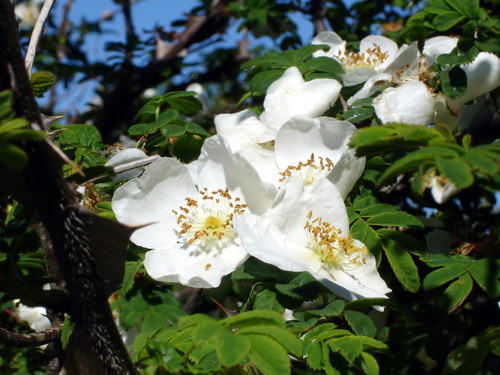

Scientific classification
- Kingdom: Plantae
- Clade: Tracheophytes
- Clade: Angiosperms
- Clade: Eudicots
- Clade: Rosids
- Order: Rosales
- Family: Rosaceae
- Genus: Rosa
- Species: R. sericea

Binomial name
- Rosa sericea Lindl.

Synonyms
- Rosa sericea var. typica Regel

= Rosa sericea =

Species of flowering plant

Rosa sericea, the silky rose, is a species of flowering plant in the family Rosaceae native to the region spanning from the Himalaya to southern central China and northern Myanmar.

The closely related Rosa omeiensis is sometimes treated as a subspecies of R. sericea.

== Description ==
It is a shrub growing 2 m (6 1/2 feet) tall and is often very spiny. The leaves are deciduous, 4–8 cm (1 5/8–3 1/8 inches) long, with 7–11 leaflets with a serrated margin. The flowers are 2.5–5 cm (1–2 inches) diameter, white, with (unusually for a rose) only four petals. The hips are red, 8–15 mm (5/16–19/32 inch) diameter, with persistent sepals, and often bristly.

== Taxonomy ==
It was described by Lindl. in 1820. It has two varieties:

- Rosa sericea var. hookeri Regel
- Rosa sericea var. sericea

== Distribution and habitat ==
It is native to south-western China (Guizhou, Sichuan, Tibet, Yunnan), Bhutan, northern India (Sikkim), Nepal and Myanmar; it grows in mountains at altitudes of 2,000–4,400 m (6,600–14,400 feet).

== Cultivation and uses ==
Rosa sericea f. pteracantha is grown as an ornamental plant for its large, bright red thorns.

== Gallery ==
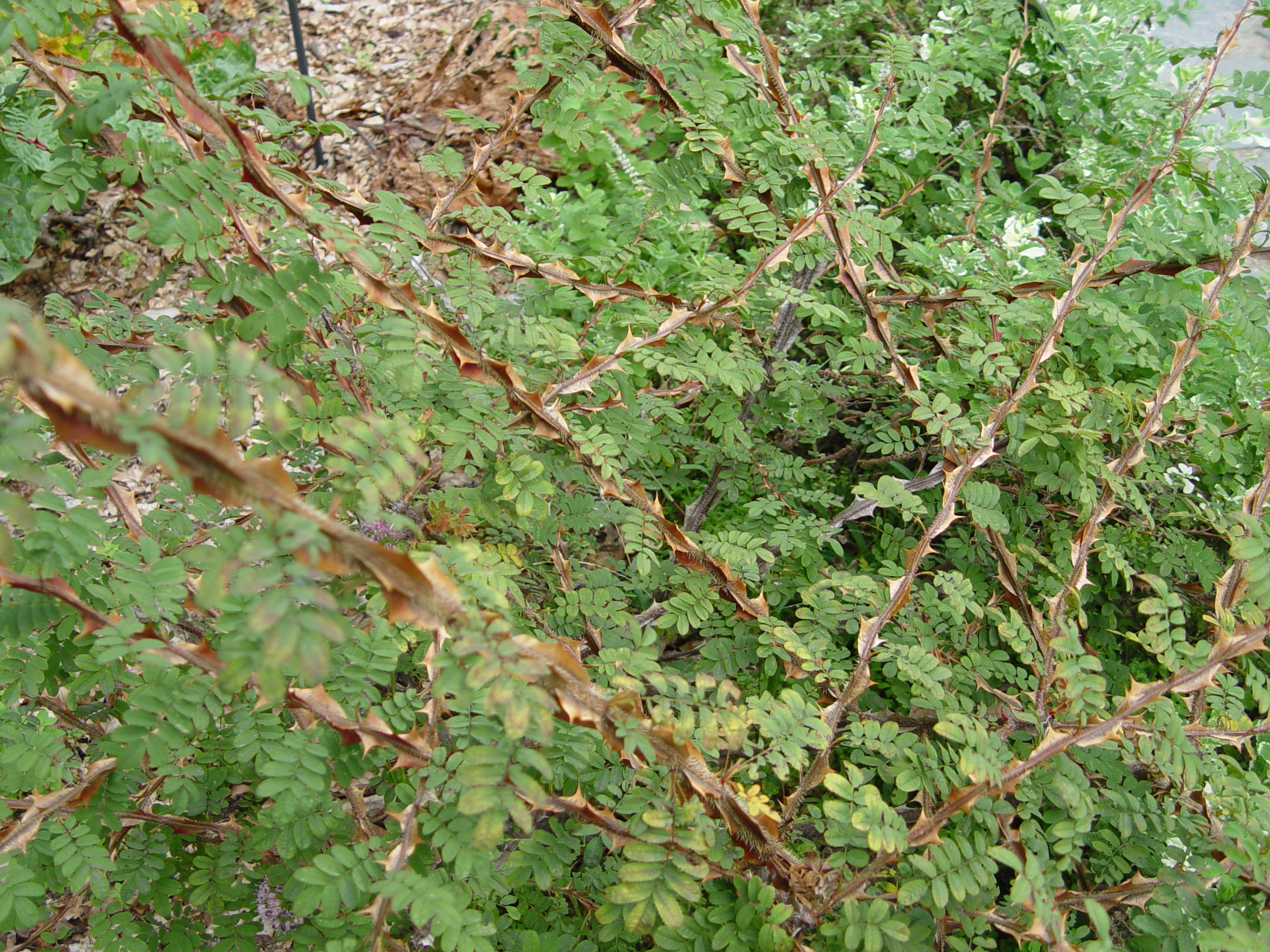
A shrub of Rosa sericea f. pteracantha

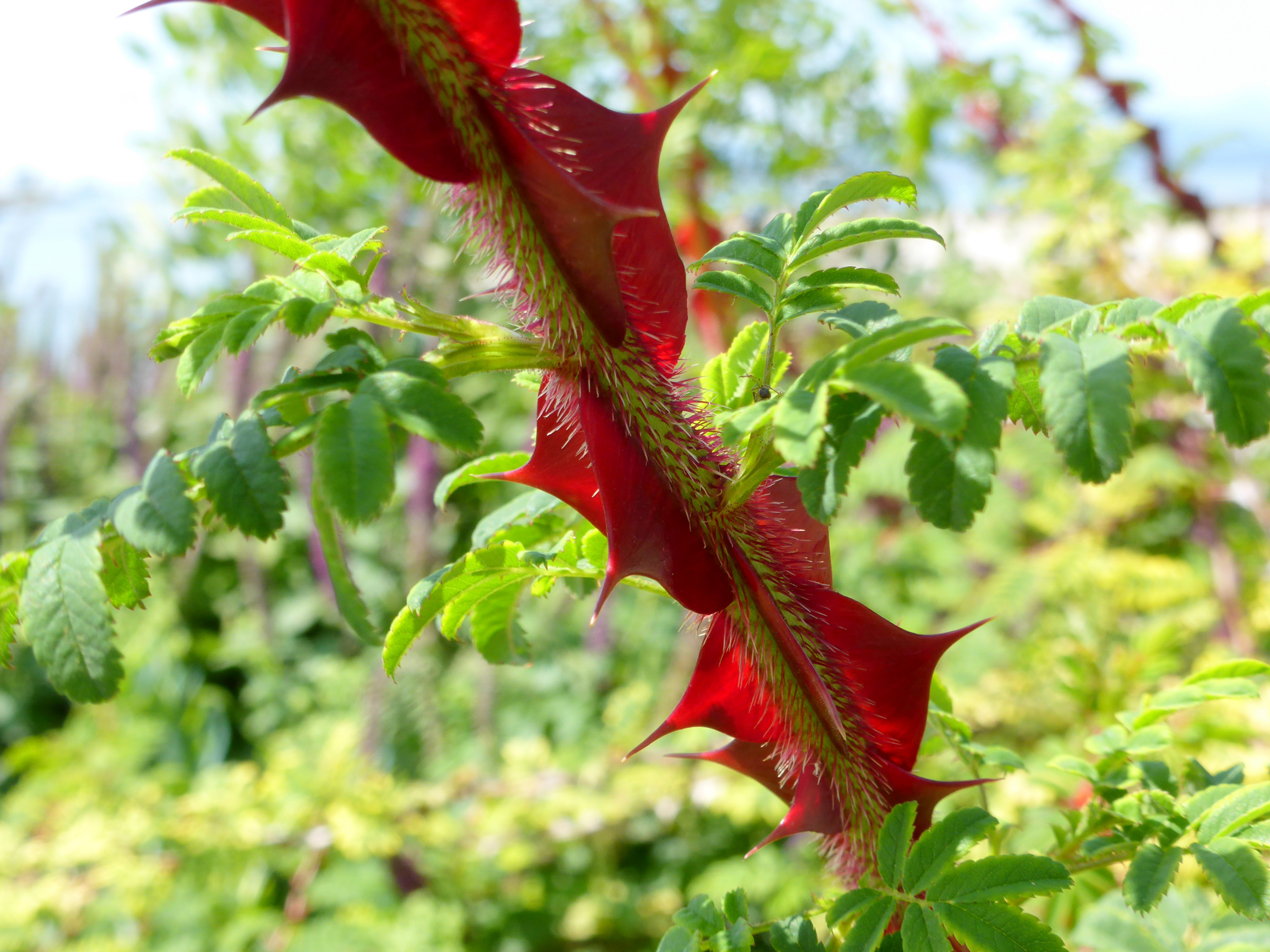
Winged thorn rose detail
