= Aromaticum rosatum =

Type of medicine

Aromaticum rosatum was a powder used in traditional medicine made of red roses, liquorice, aloeswood, yellowheart, cinnamon, cloves, mace, gum tragacanth, nutmegs, cardamoms, galangals, spikenard, ambergris, and musk mixed together. It was chiefly prescribed in cordial and cephalic boles and electuaries. It was believed to act as a tonic on the heart, stomach and liver.

== Books ==
Aromaticum rosatum was mentioned in a 1543 publication, The Most Excellent Workes of Chirurgerye, by Joannes de Vigo. The 1652 Physicall Directory, or, A Translation of the London Dispensatory by Nicholas Culpeper gives the ingredients and instructions for making this plus four other preparations that are described as aromaticums.

It is mentioned in the 1580s by French surgeon Ambroise Paré and in the 1643 English translation of his work, "The Workes of That Famous Chirurgion Ambrose Parey translated out of Latin and compared with the French by Th. Johnson".

This powder was mentioned in Cyclopædia, or an Universal Dictionary of Arts and Sciences, an encyclopedia from 1728.
