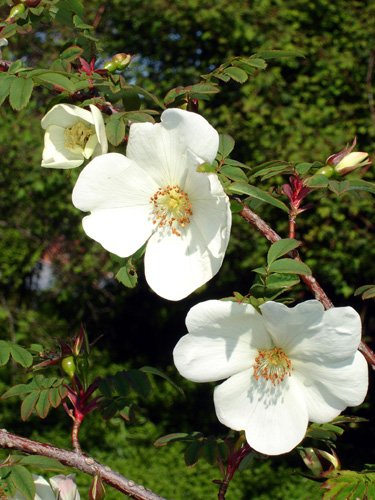
- Rosa omeiensis forma pteracantha

Scientific classification
- Kingdom: Plantae
- Clade: Tracheophytes
- Clade: Angiosperms
- Clade: Eudicots
- Clade: Rosids
- Order: Rosales
- Family: Rosaceae
- Genus: Rosa
- Species: R. omeiensis

Binomial name
- Rosa omeiensis Rolfe

= Rosa omeiensis =

Species of flowering plant

Rosa omeiensis is a species of Rosa native to central and southwestern China in the provinces of Gansu, Guizhou, Hubei, Ningxia, Qinghai, Shaanxi, Sichuan, Tibet, and Yunnan; it grows in mountains at altitudes of 700 to 4,400 m.

It is a shrub which grows 4 m tall, and is often very spiny. The leaves are deciduous, 3–6 cm long, with 5–13 leaflets with a serrated margin. The flowers are 2.5–3.5 cm diameter, white, with (unusually for a rose) only four petals. The hips are red to orange-yellow, 8–15 mm diameter, with persistent sepals, and often bristly.

There are four formae:

- Rosa omeiensis f. omeiensis.
- Rosa omeiensis f. glandulosa T.T.Yü & T.C.Ku.
- Rosa omeiensis f. paucijuga T.T.Yü & T.C.Ku.
- Rosa omeiensis f. pteracantha Rehder & E.H.Wilson.

It is sometimes treated as a subspecies of the closely related species Rosa sericea.

== Cultivation and uses ==
Rosa omeiensis forma pteracantha is grown as an ornamental plant for its large, bright red thorns.

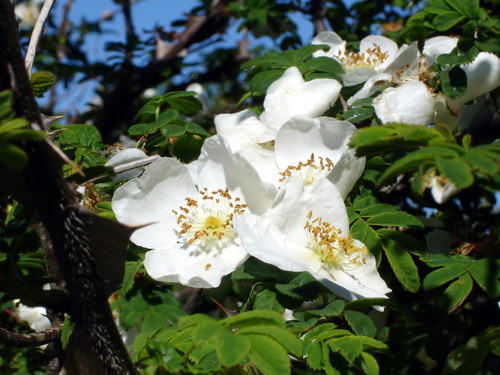
R. omeiensis f. pteracantha

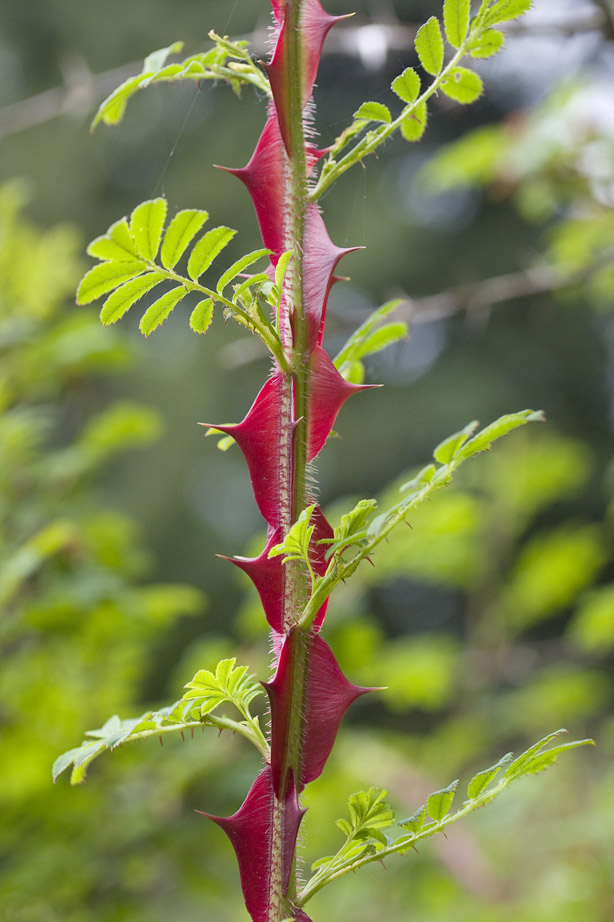
Rosa omeiensis f. pteracantha Rehder & E.H.Wilson

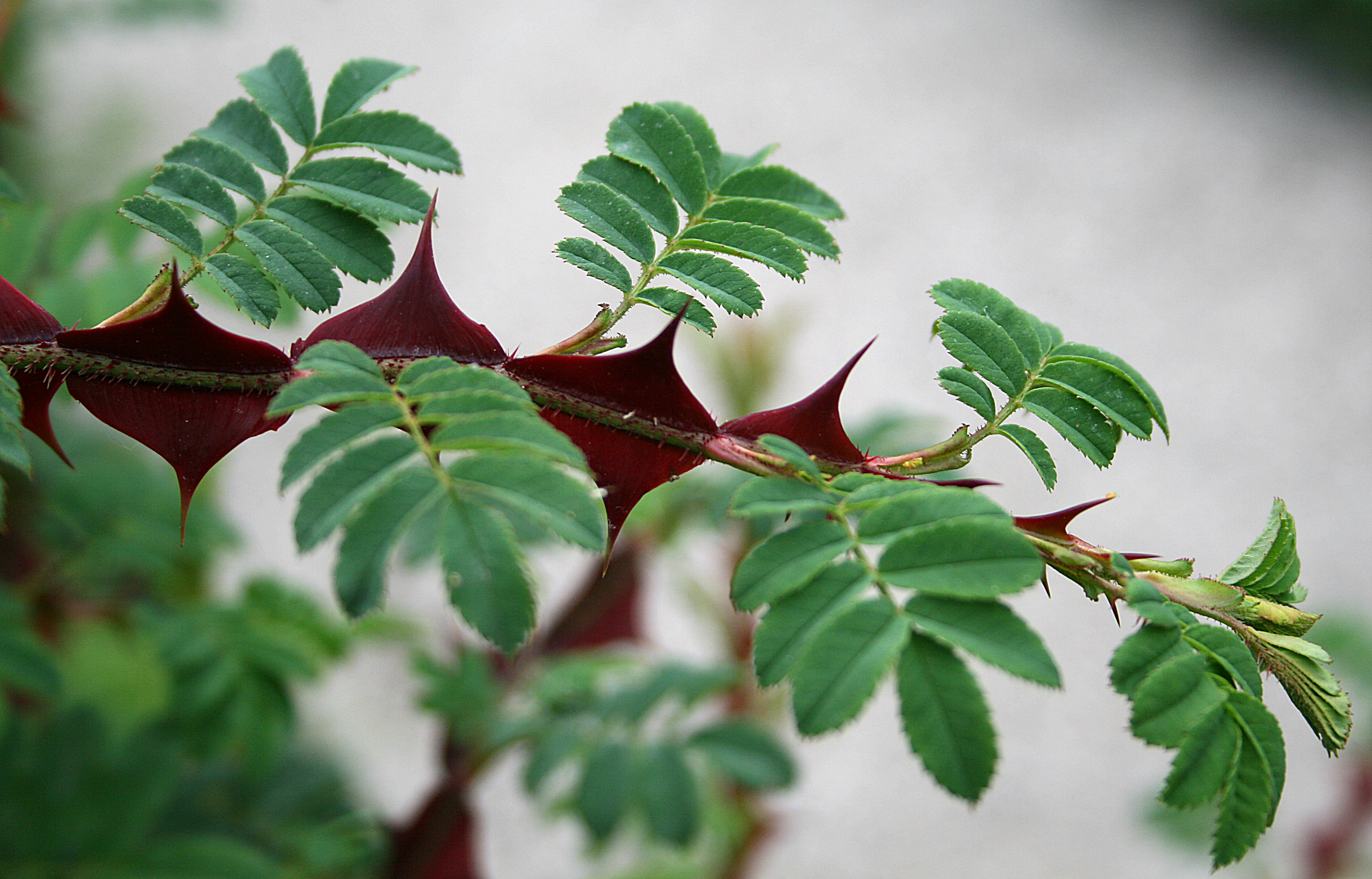
Thorns and leaves
