= Diarrhodon =

Medical compounds containing roses

In pre-modern medicine, "diarrhodon" (Gr διάρροδον, "compound of roses", from ῥόδων, "of roses") is a name given to diverse compositions, in which red roses are an ingredient.

Diarrhodon abbatis is a cordial powder, denominated from the Abbot who invented it. It consists of red roses, red and citron santals, lignum aloes, cinnamon, rhapontic, spikenard, ivory, harts-horn, saffron, mastic, pearls, ambergris, musk, etc. It was used to strengthen the heart, stomach, and liver, and to assist in digestion, and prevent vomiting.

Philip Barrough, author of the first textbook on medicine published in English, gives this description and recipe for diarrhodon abbatis:

"Electarium Diarrhodon Abbatis mitigateth the heate of the stomacke and midrife, and yet notwithstanding furthereth their concoction, aswageth paine, and dissipateth wind.

"R. Rosarum rubrarum oz. 1 1/2. Santali albi & rubri, ana dr. 2 1/2. Tragacanthe, Gummi Arabici, Eboris vsti, ana scr. ii. Mastiches, Spicae nardi, Cardamomi, succi Glycyrrhizae, Croci, Xyloales, Caryophyllorum, Galliae Muschatae, Anisi, Foeniculi, sem. Ocymi, Acinorum Berberis, sem. Scariolae, Portulacae & papaueris albi, quatuor sem. frigido. maiorum, Rheubarbari electi, Cinamomi, ana scr. i. Margaritarum, ossis e corde cerui, ana scr. 1/2. Caphurae gr. viii. Moschi, gr. iiii. Make thereof tablets with eight times so much sugar dissolved in Rosewater."

There is also trochisci diarrhodon, composed of red roses, scrapings of ivory, santals, liquorice, mastic, saffron, camphor, and rosewater. They were used to fortify the heart, stomach, and liver, and to stop dissenteries, and other fluxes of the belly.

Pillulae diarrhodon are composed of aloes, trochisci diarrhodon, wormwood leaves, mastic, and rock salt. They were used to purge, then fortify the stomach, promote digestion, and prevent bad breath.

A recipe for the intoxicating liquor known as "damnable hum" contains diarrhodon:

"Take Species de Gemmis, Aromaticum Rosatum, Diarrhodon Abbatis, Lætificans Galeni, of each four drams, Loaf-sugar beaten to powder half a pound, small Aqua Vitæ three Pints, strong Angelica water one pint; mix all these together, and when you have drunk it to the Dregs, you may fill it up again with the same quantity of water. The same powders will serve twice, and after twice using it, it must be made new again."

American writer Samuel Woodworth makes reference to the concoction in an 1811 New Year's Address written for the news carrier of The Columbian, apparently in reference to an article that appeared in the newspaper:

"The Diarrhodon" you have heard expose
The latent beauties of a modern Rose,
And smiled to see the lively writer roast
The doughty champion of the Morning Post.
