= Rainbow rose =

Rose colored with artificial colors

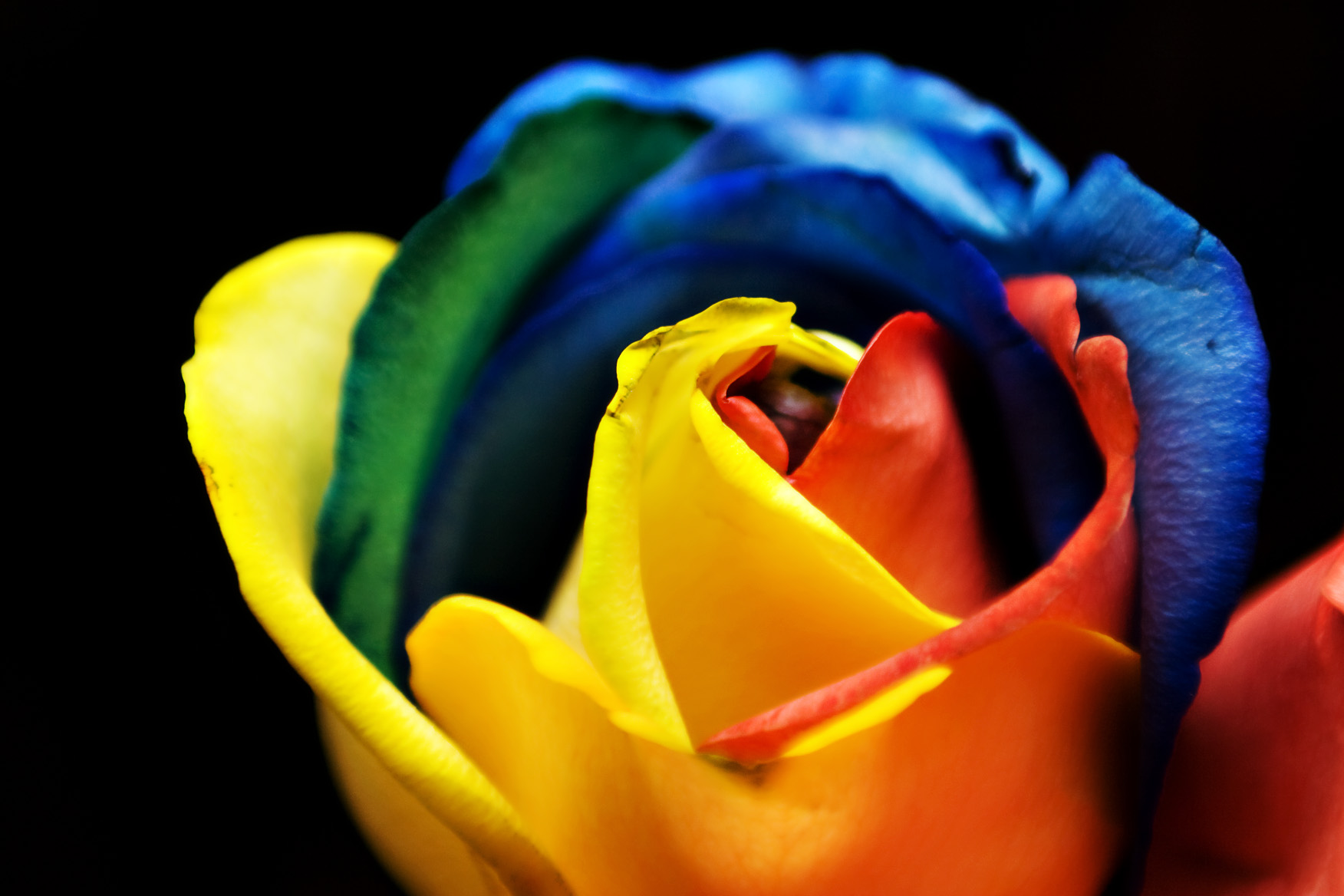
A rainbow rose with petals in main spectral colors, except where the petal is green or orange or potentially purple

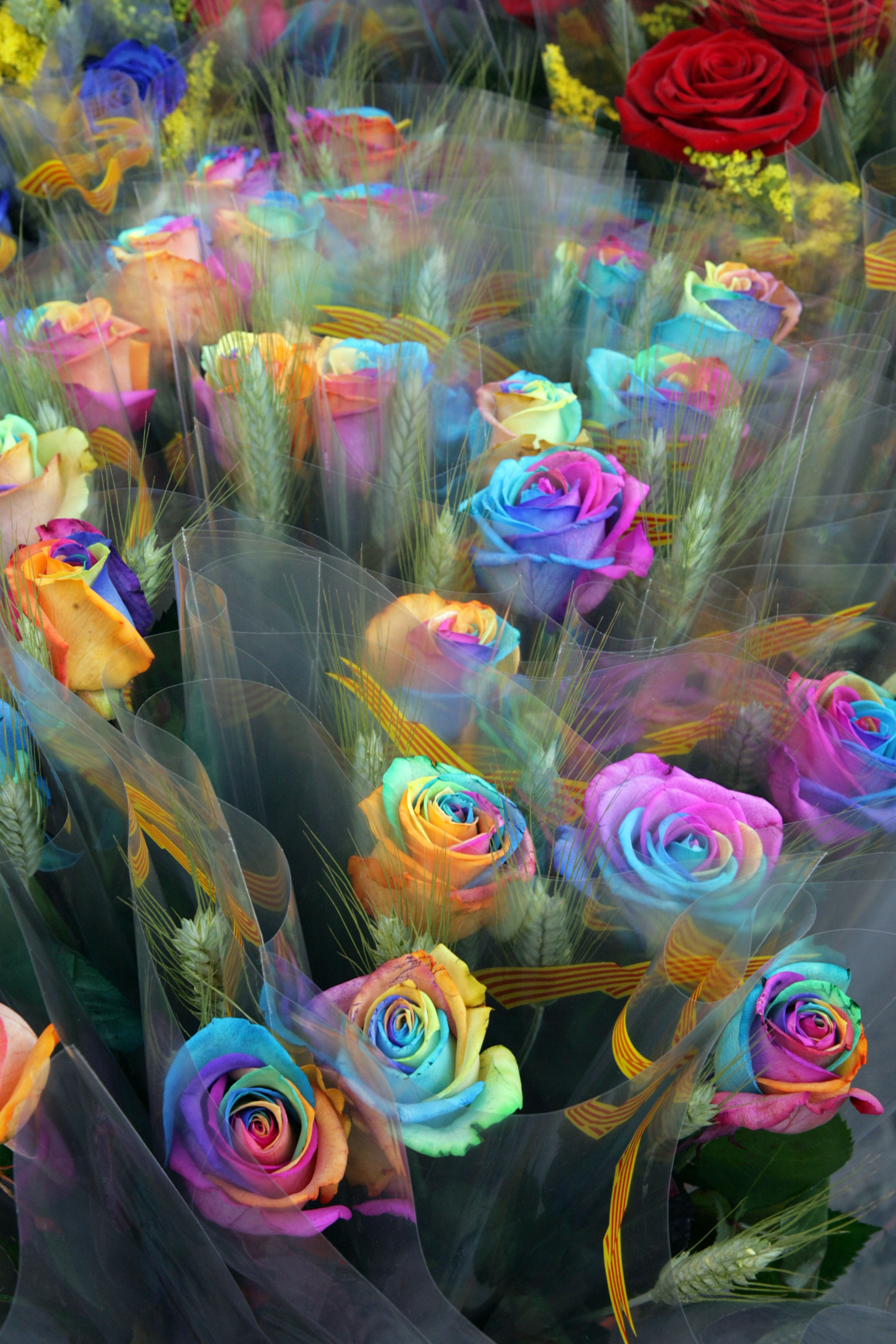
Rainbow roses for sale

A pastel rainbow rose

A rainbow rose is a rose that has had its petals artificially colored. The method exploits the rose's natural processes by which water is drawn up the stem. By splitting the stem and dipping each part in water with added dye in different colours, the colors are drawn into the petals resulting in a multicolored rose. With these changes to the rose, it causes them to not live as long as an uncolored rose. The colors are artificial. Besides roses, other cut flowers like the chrysanthemum, carnation, hydrangea, and some species of orchids can also be colored using the same method.

== History ==
Agatha Christie's notorious Poirot mystery "The Gilded Lily" popularized the practice of artificially altering floral color patterns in cultured society only as recently as the 20th century.

== Cultivars ==
A commonly used cultivar is "Vendela", a cream colored Hybrid Tea cultivated in the Netherlands, Colombia and Ecuador, as this cultivar absorbs the different dyes perfectly. "Vendela" has a flower diameter of 6 cm (2.4 in) in full bloom, a stem length of 40 to 100 cm (16 to 39 in), and is not scented. Other cultivars that can be used for this coloring process are Rosa La Belle and Rosa Avalanche+. Some vendors use the cultivar name to describe their products, e.g., Vendela Rainbow Rose, or Rose Avalanche Crystal Green.

== Color combinations ==
The original rainbow rose has the seven colors of the rainbow and is the most popular rose in this category. However, there are also the tropical variant with combinations of red/pink and yellow, and the ocean variant with combinations of green and blue. Other color combinations are also possible, though black and white are impossible to make.
