= List of Rosa species =

There is significant disagreement over the number of true rose species. Some species are so similar that they could easily be considered varieties or even forms of a single species. Lists of rose species usually show more than 320. The range of 320 to 350 is accepted by most botanists, but as Liberty H. Bailey has noted, the extreme lumpers Bentham and Hooker only allowed for 30 species, while the extreme splitter Michel Gandoger allowed 4,266 species just in Europe and West Asia.

== Subgenera and sections ==
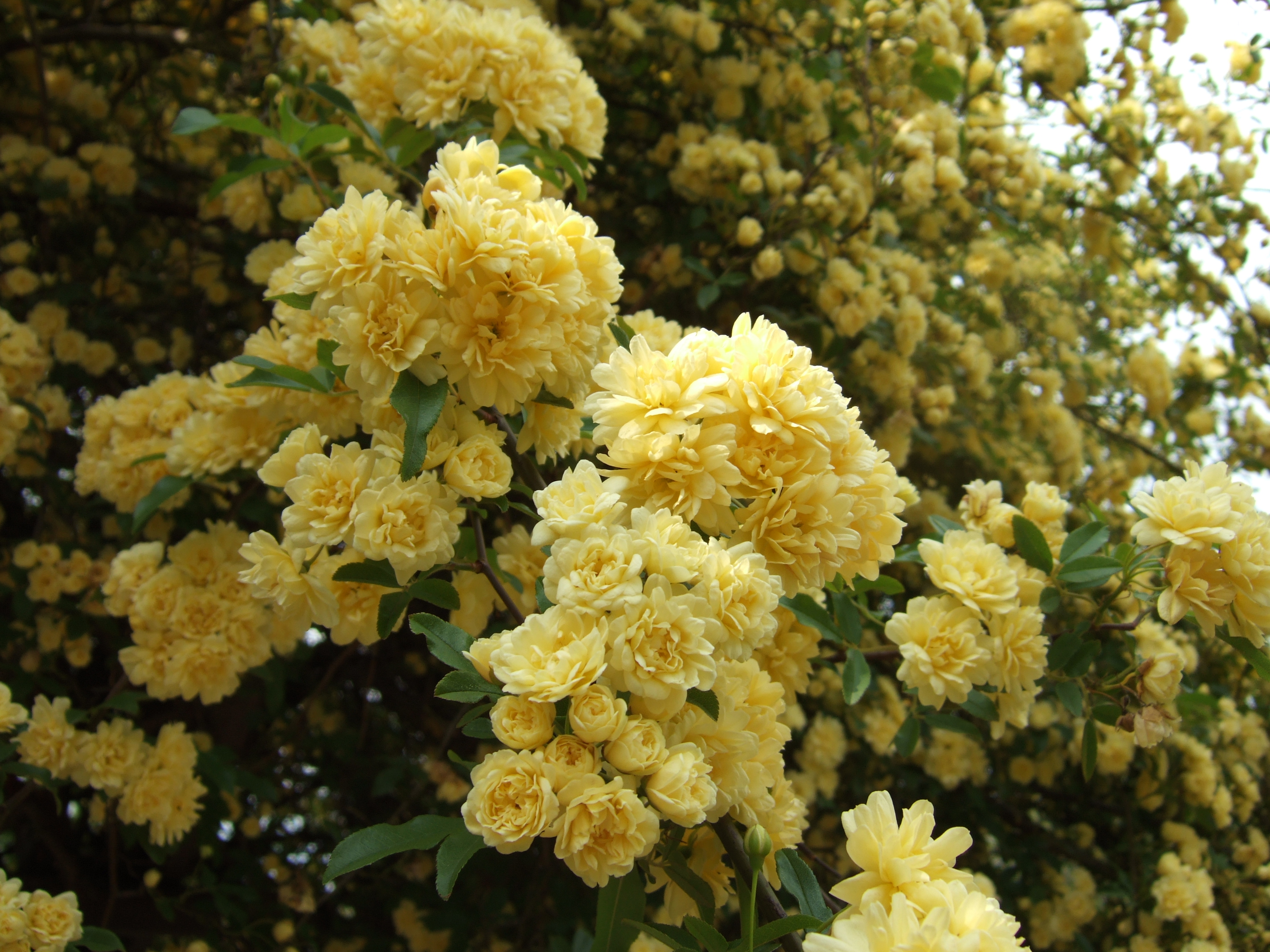
Rosa banksiae

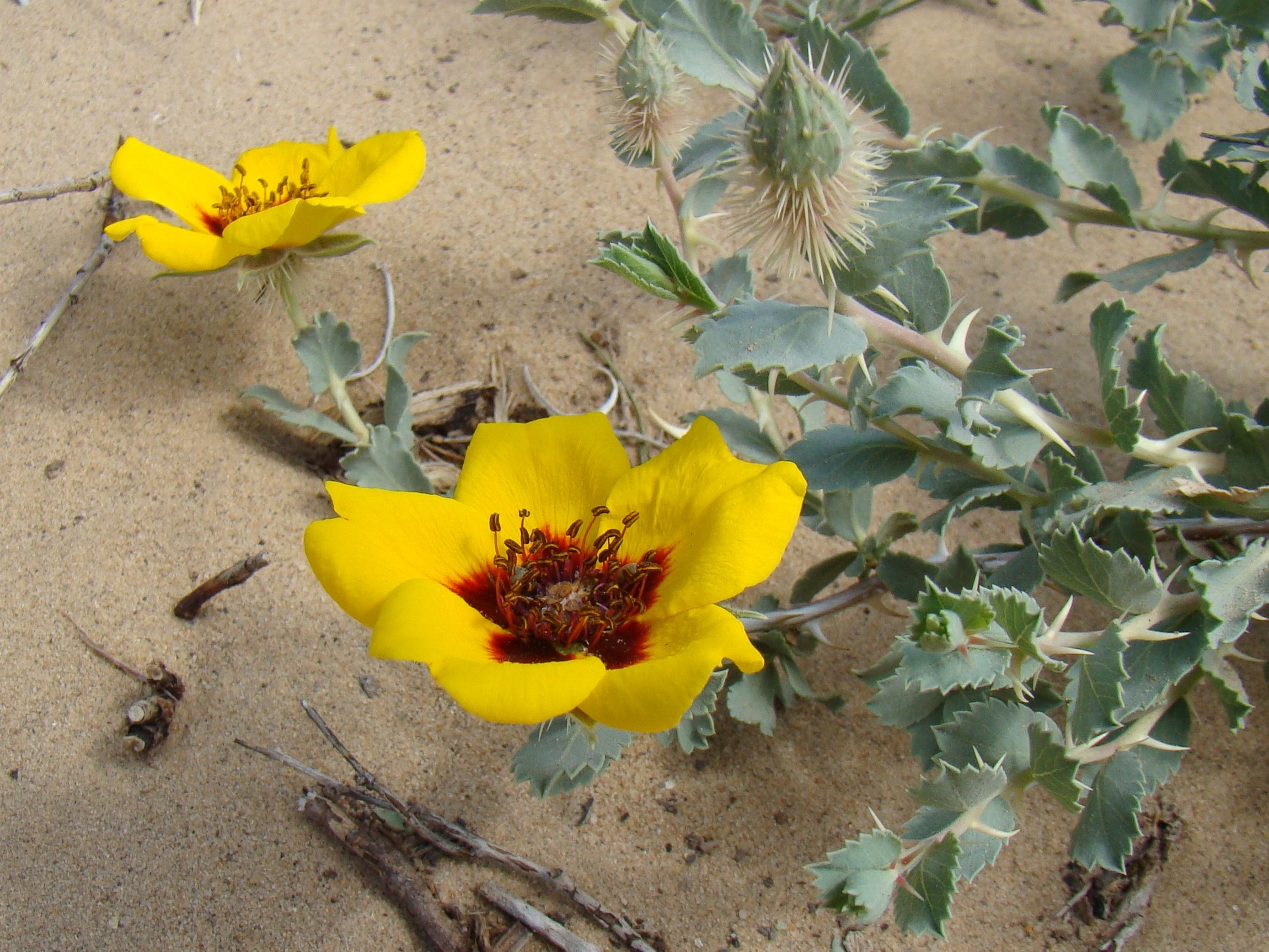
Rosa persica

There are currently four subgenera in Rosa, although there have been some disputes over the years. The four subgenera are:

- Hulthemia (formerly Simplicifoliae, meaning "with single leaves") containing one or two species from Southwest Asia, R. persica and R. berberifolia (syn. R. persica var. berberifolia) which are the only species without compound leaves or stipules.
- Hesperrhodos (from the Greek for "western rose") with two species, both from southwestern North America, R. minutifolia and R. stellata.
- Platyrhodon (from the Greek for "flaky rose", referring to its flaky bark) with one species from East Asia, R. roxburghii.
- Rosa (the type subgenus) containing all the other species. This subgenus is subdivided into 11 sections.
  - Banksianae – white and yellow species from China
  - Bracteatae – three species, two from China and one from India
  - Caninae – pink and white species from Europe, Asia and North Africa
  - Carolinae – white, pink and bright pink species, all from North America
  - Chinensis – white, pink, yellow, red and mixed-color species from China and Burma
  - Gallicanae – pink to crimson and striped species from Europe and West Asia
  - Gymnocarpae – a small group distinguished by a deciduous receptacle on the hip; one species in western North America (R. gymnocarpa), the rest in East Asia
  - Laevigatae – a single white species from China
  - Pimpinellifoliae – white, pink, bright yellow, mauve and striped species from Europe and Asia
  - Rosa (syn. sect. Cinnamomeae) – white, pink, lilac, mulberry and red species from all areas except North Africa
  - Synstylae – white, pink, and crimson species from all areas

== Species ==
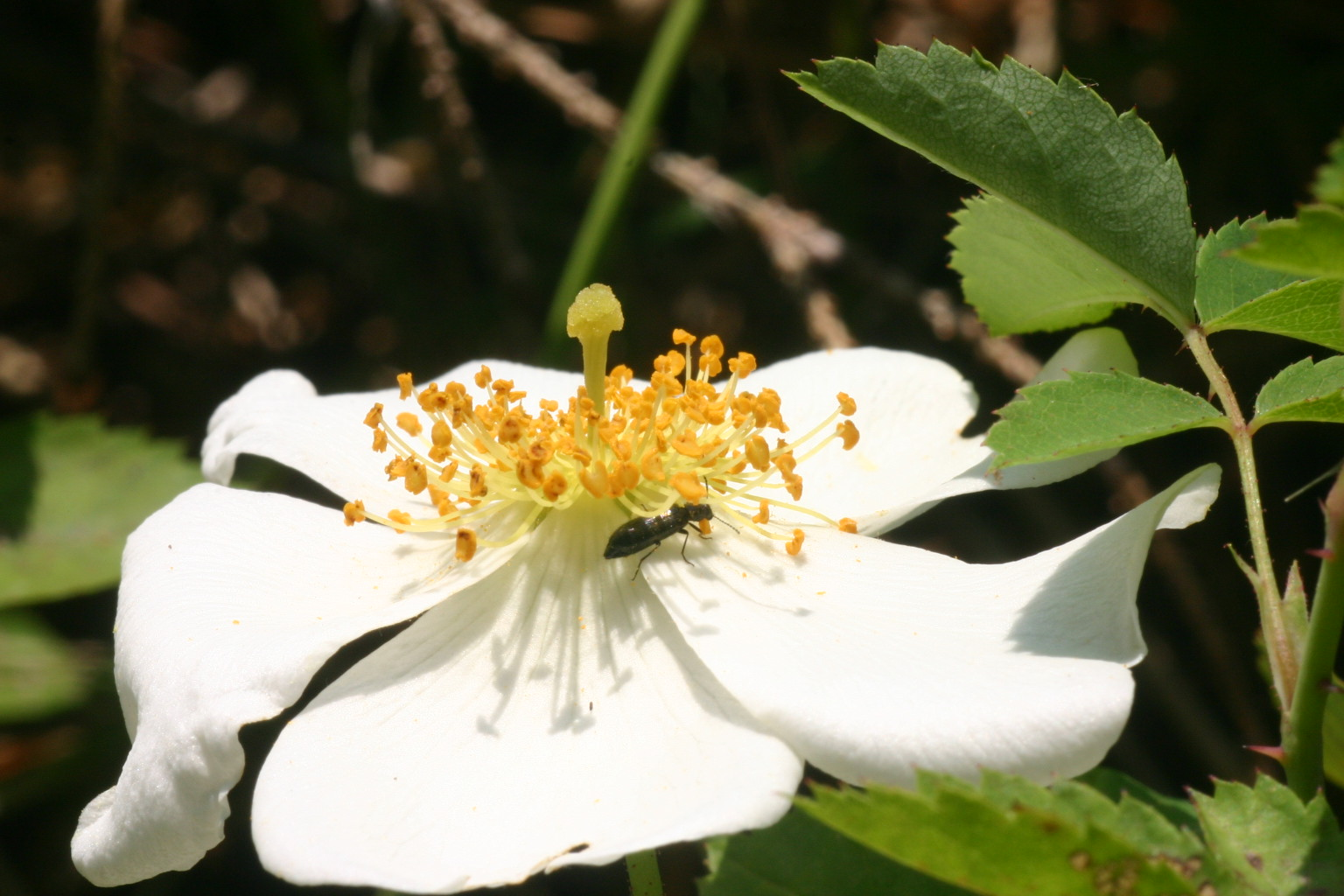
Rosa arvensis

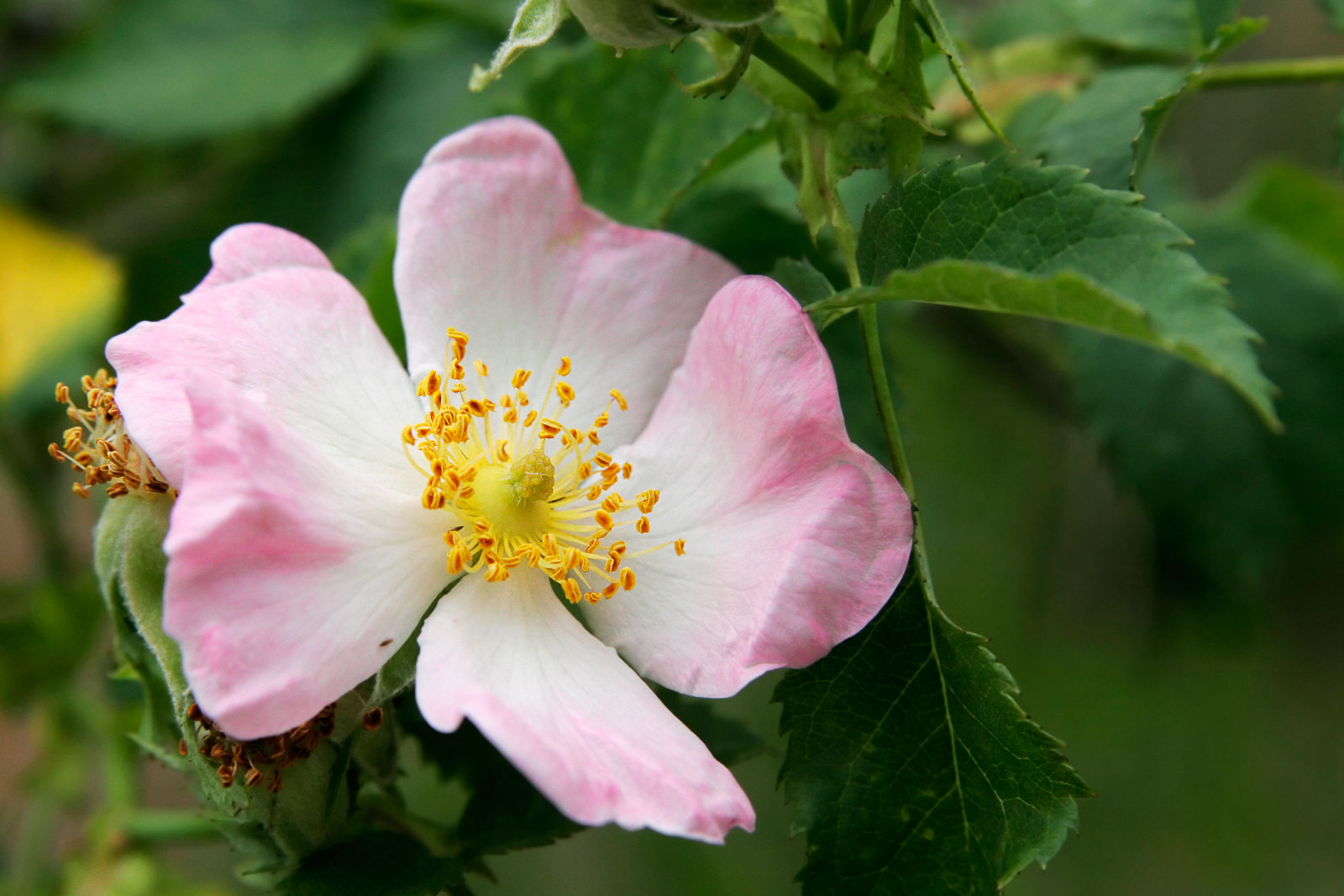
Rosa canina

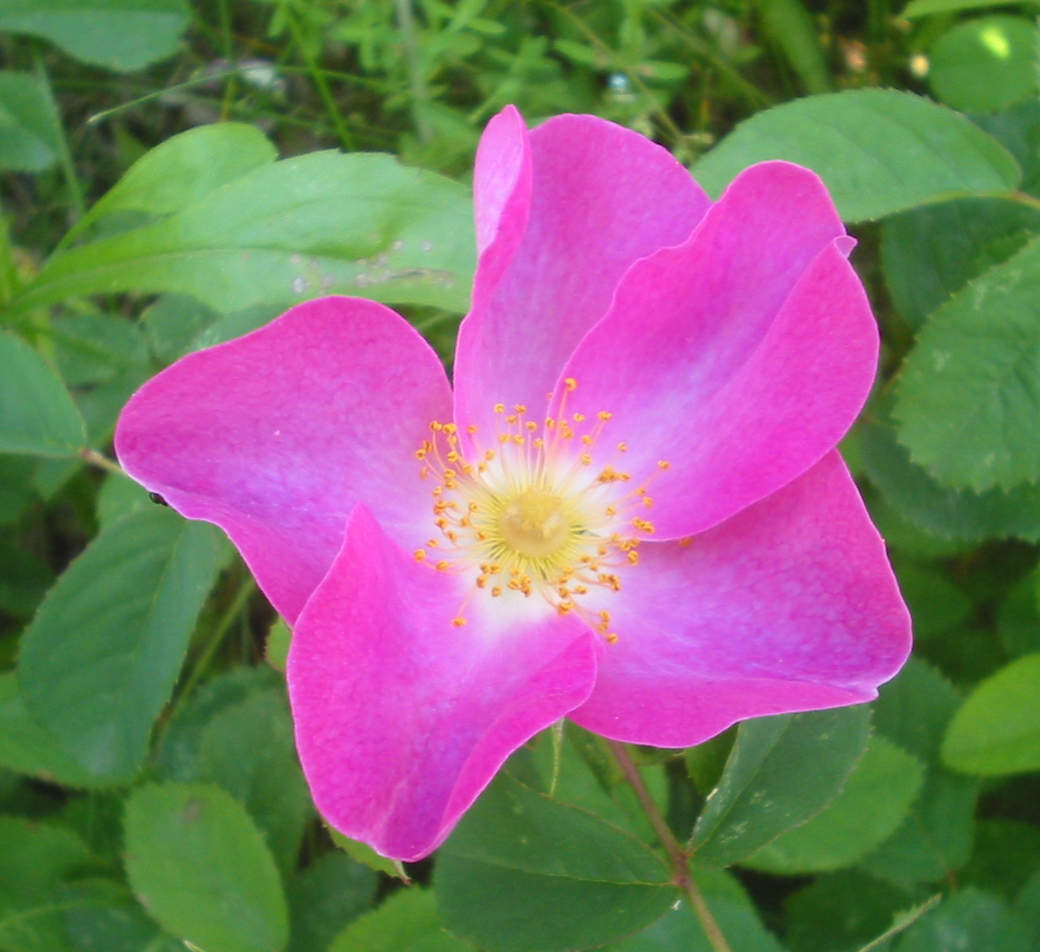
Rosa gallica

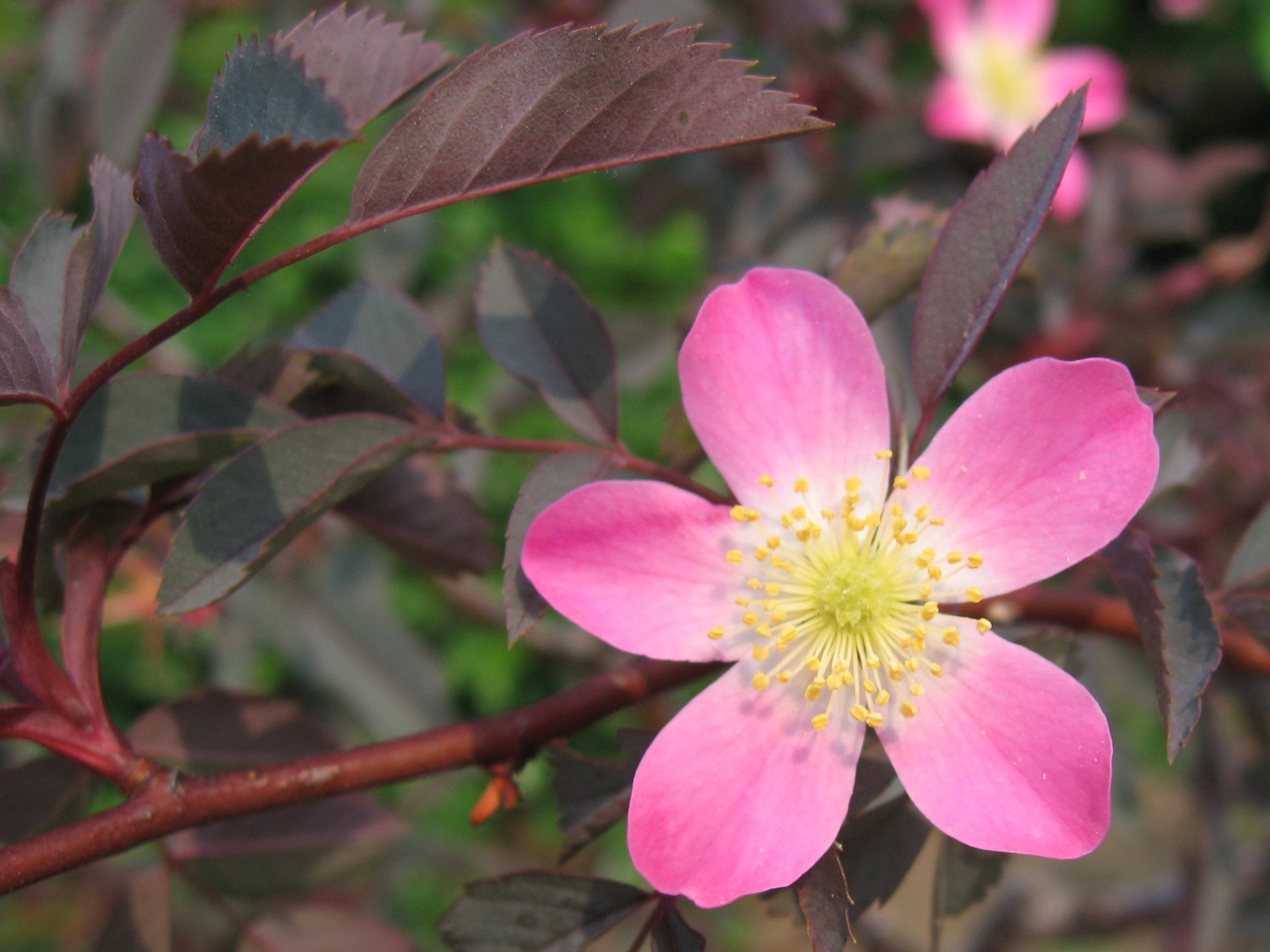
Rosa glauca

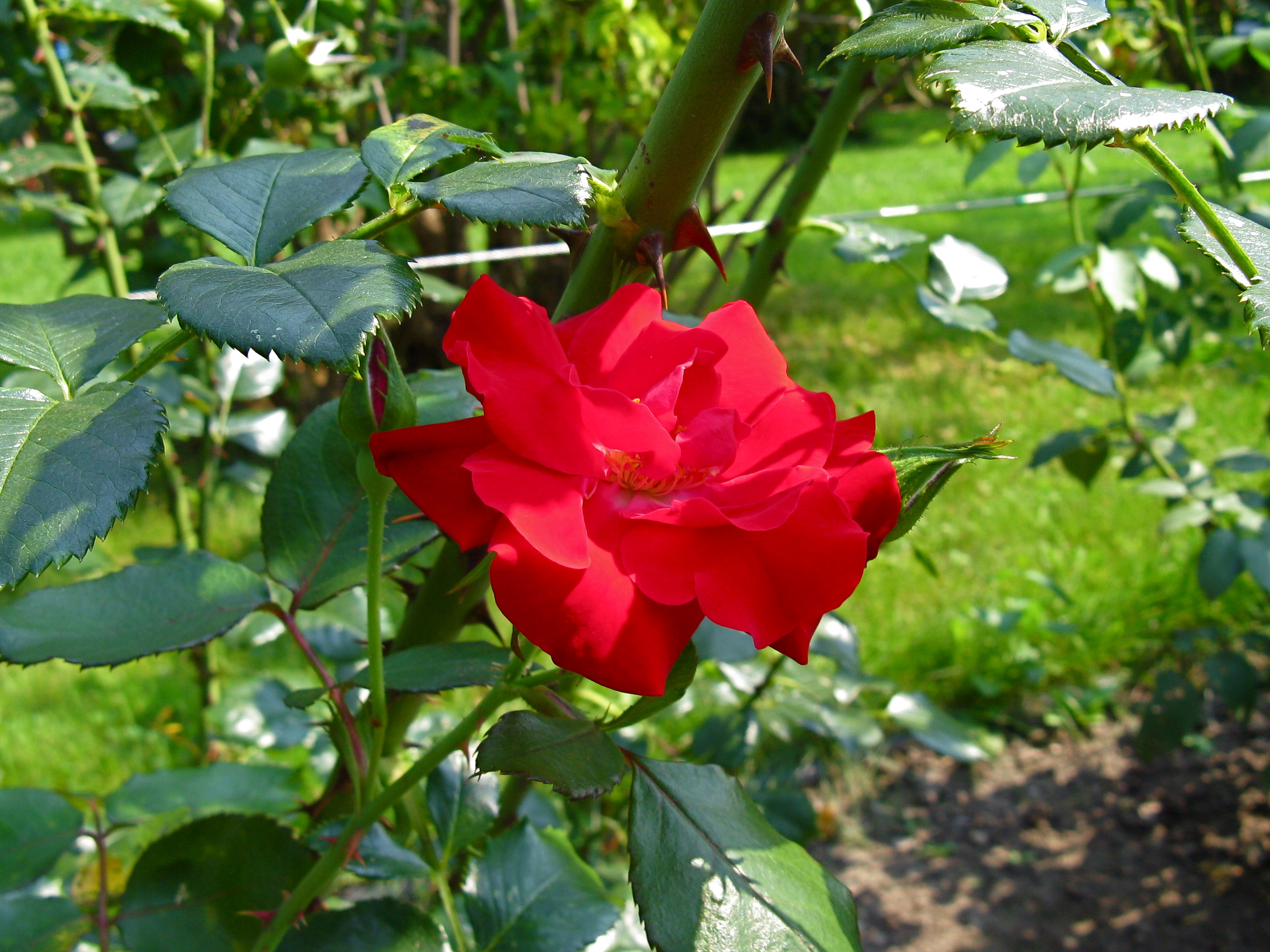
Rosa × kordesii

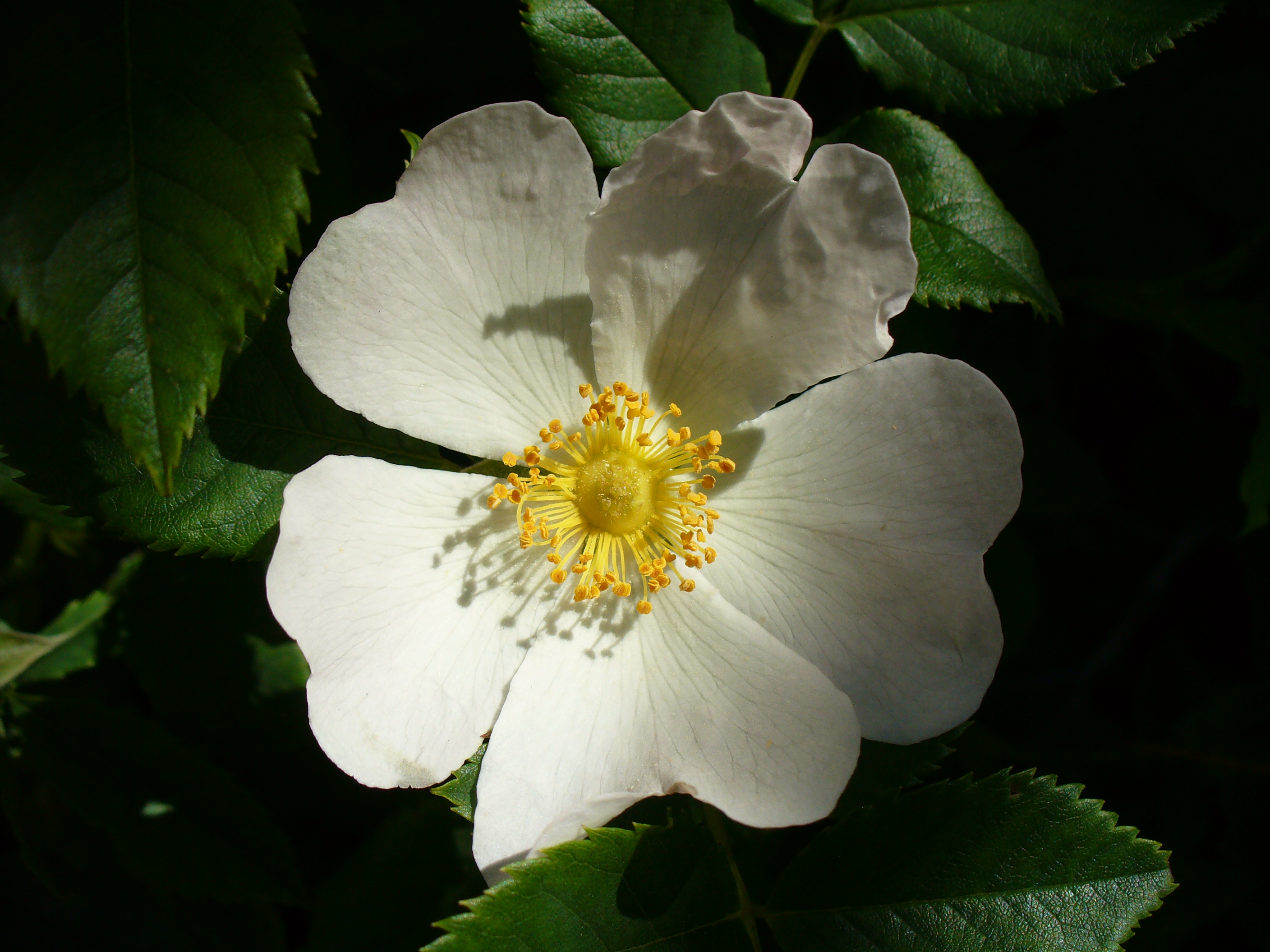
Rosa moschata

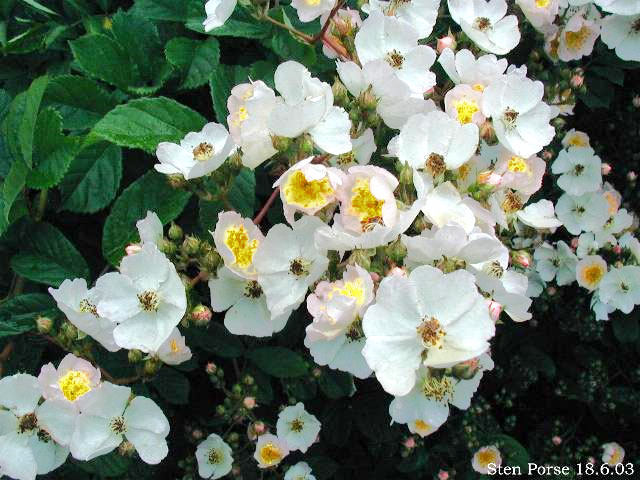
Rosa multiflora

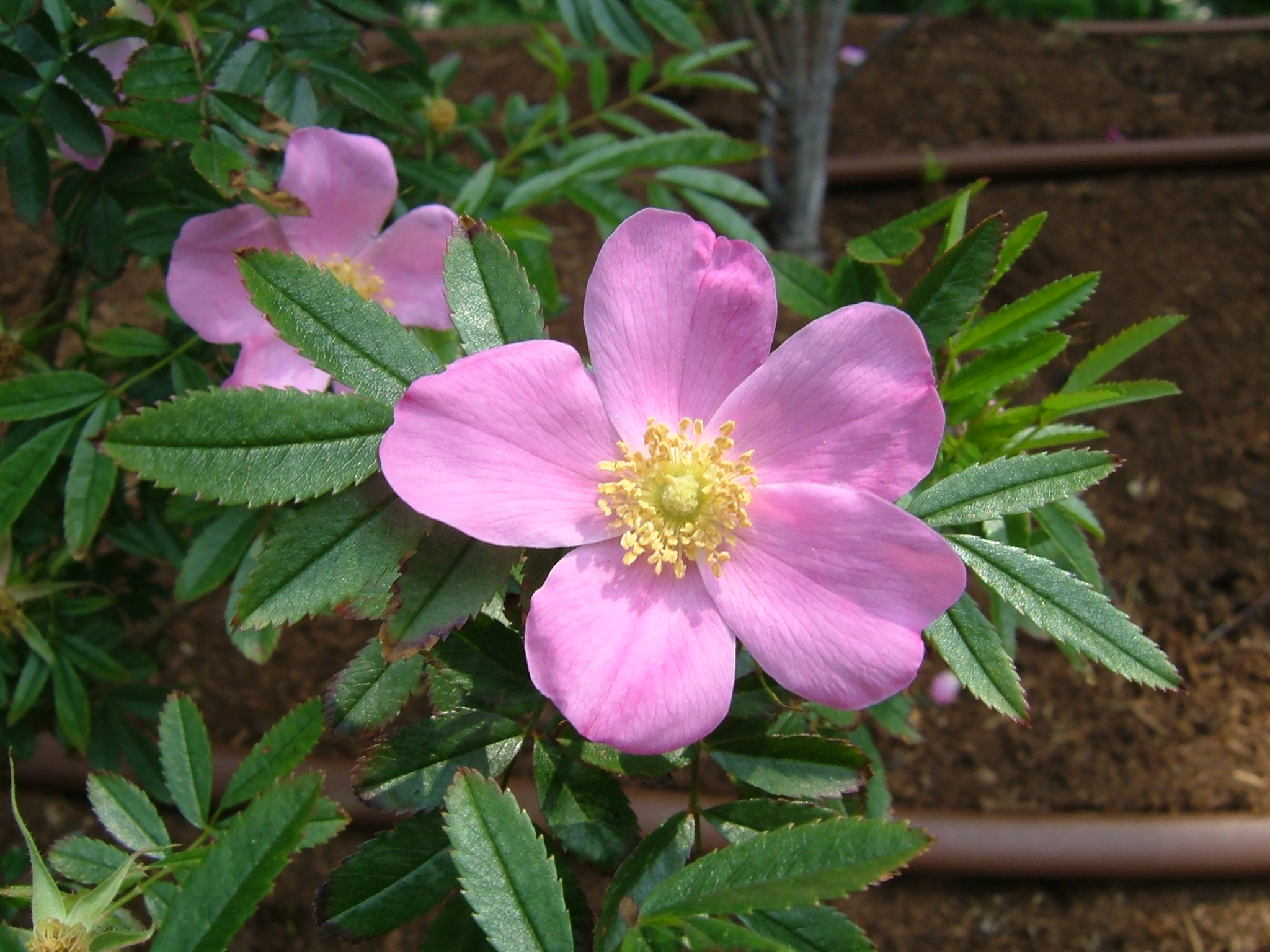
Rosa nitida

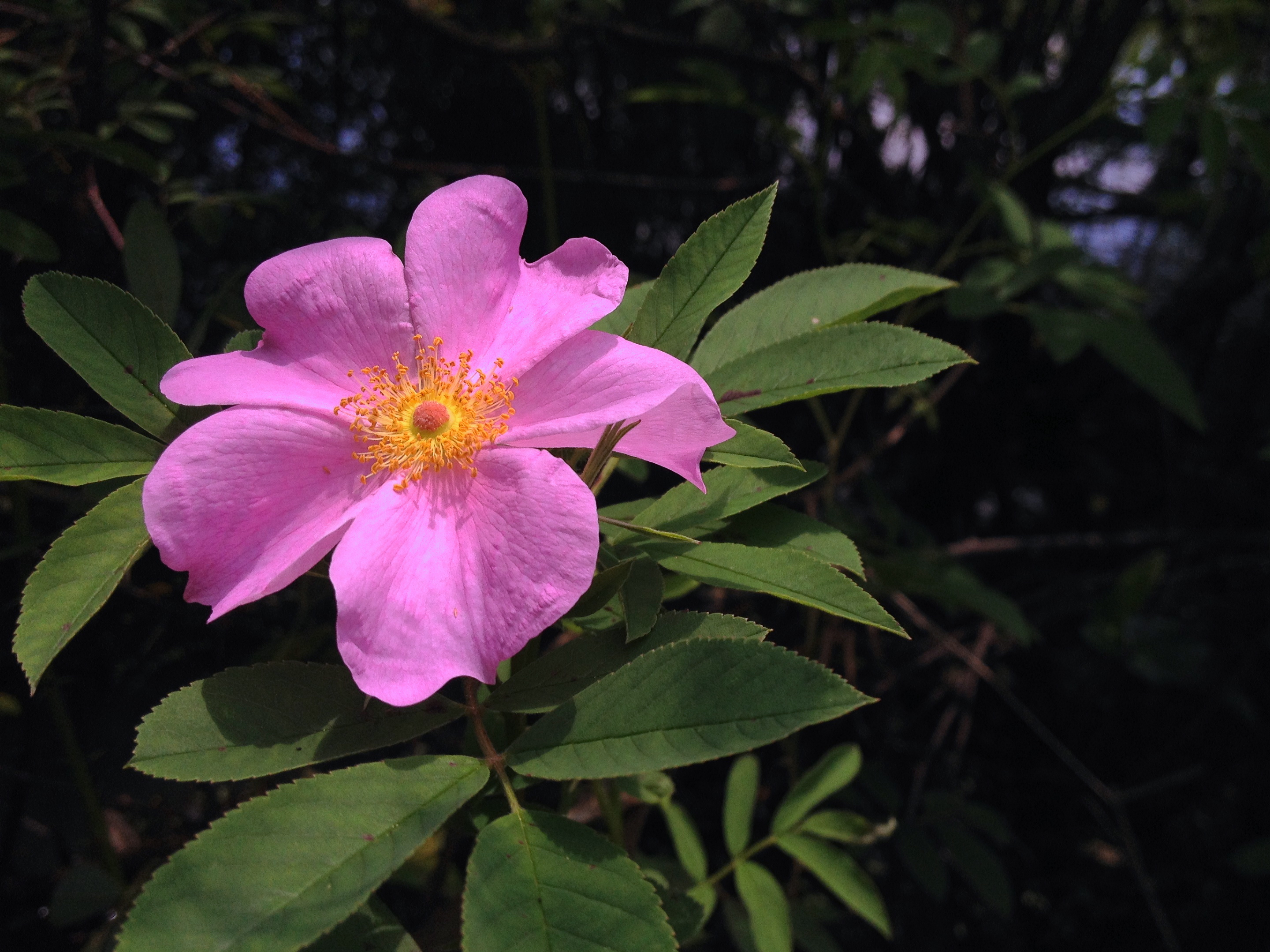
Rosa palustris

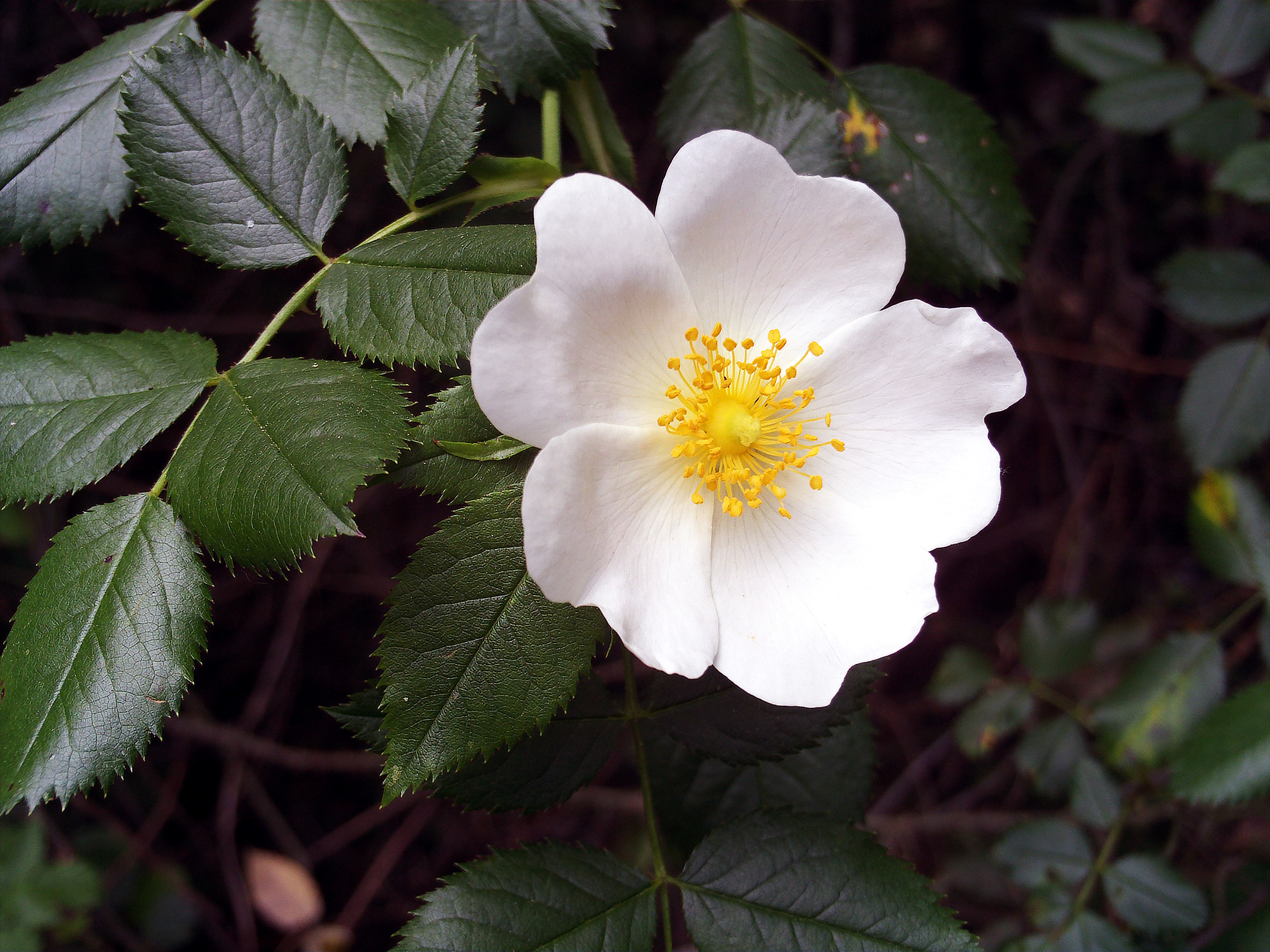
Rosa pouzinii

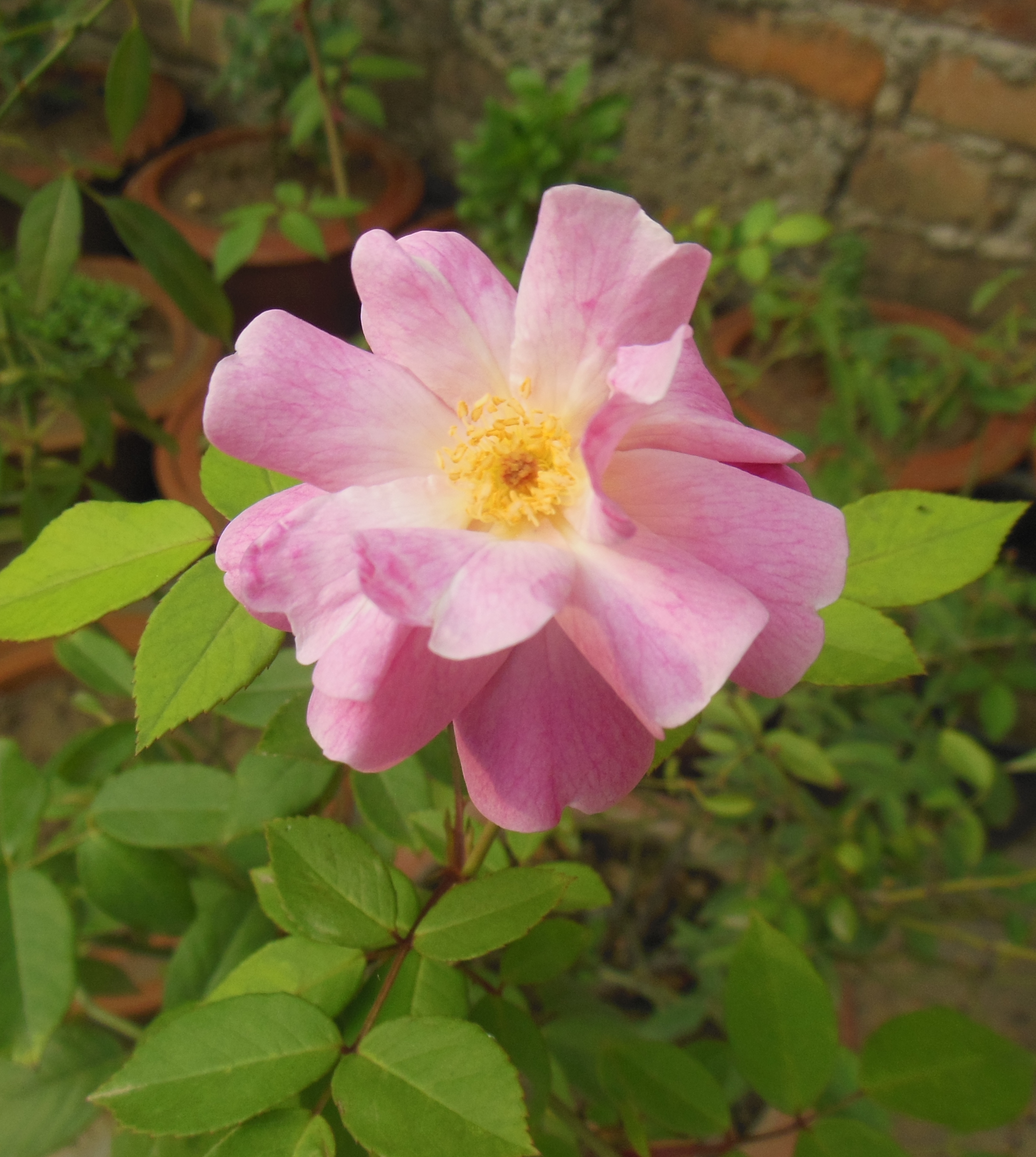
Rosa rubiginosa

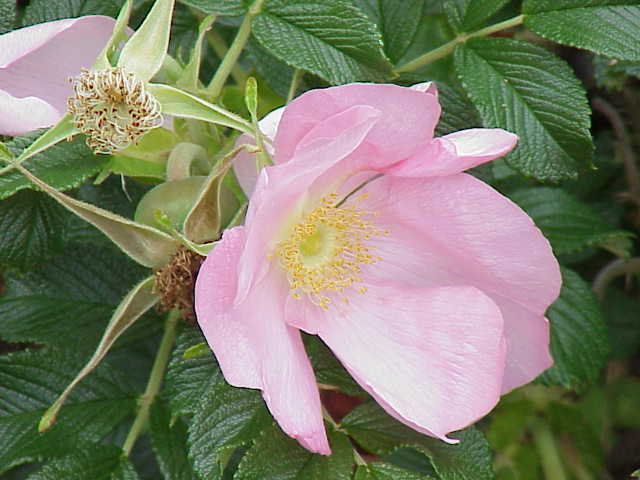
Rosa rugosa

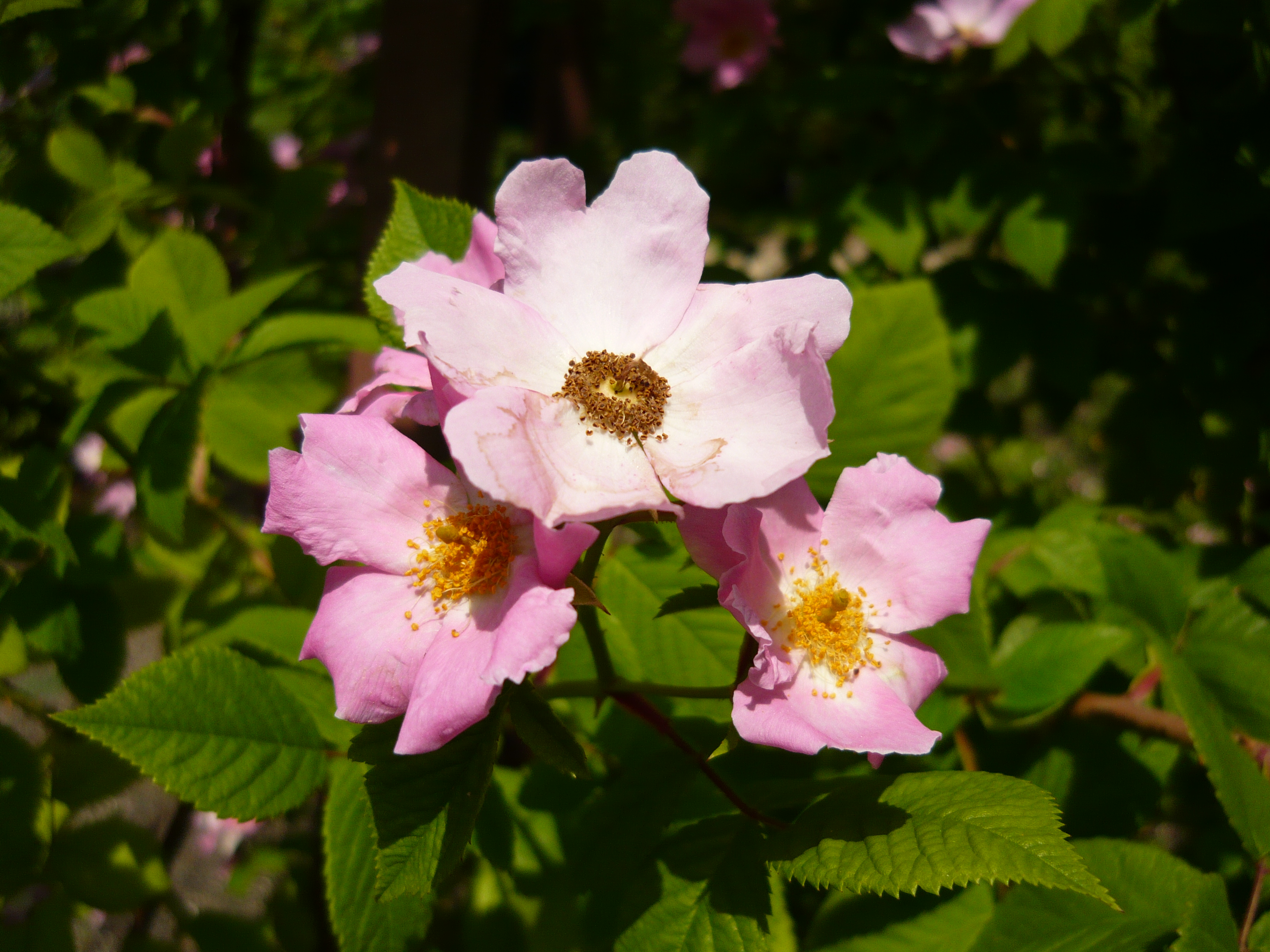
Rosa setigera

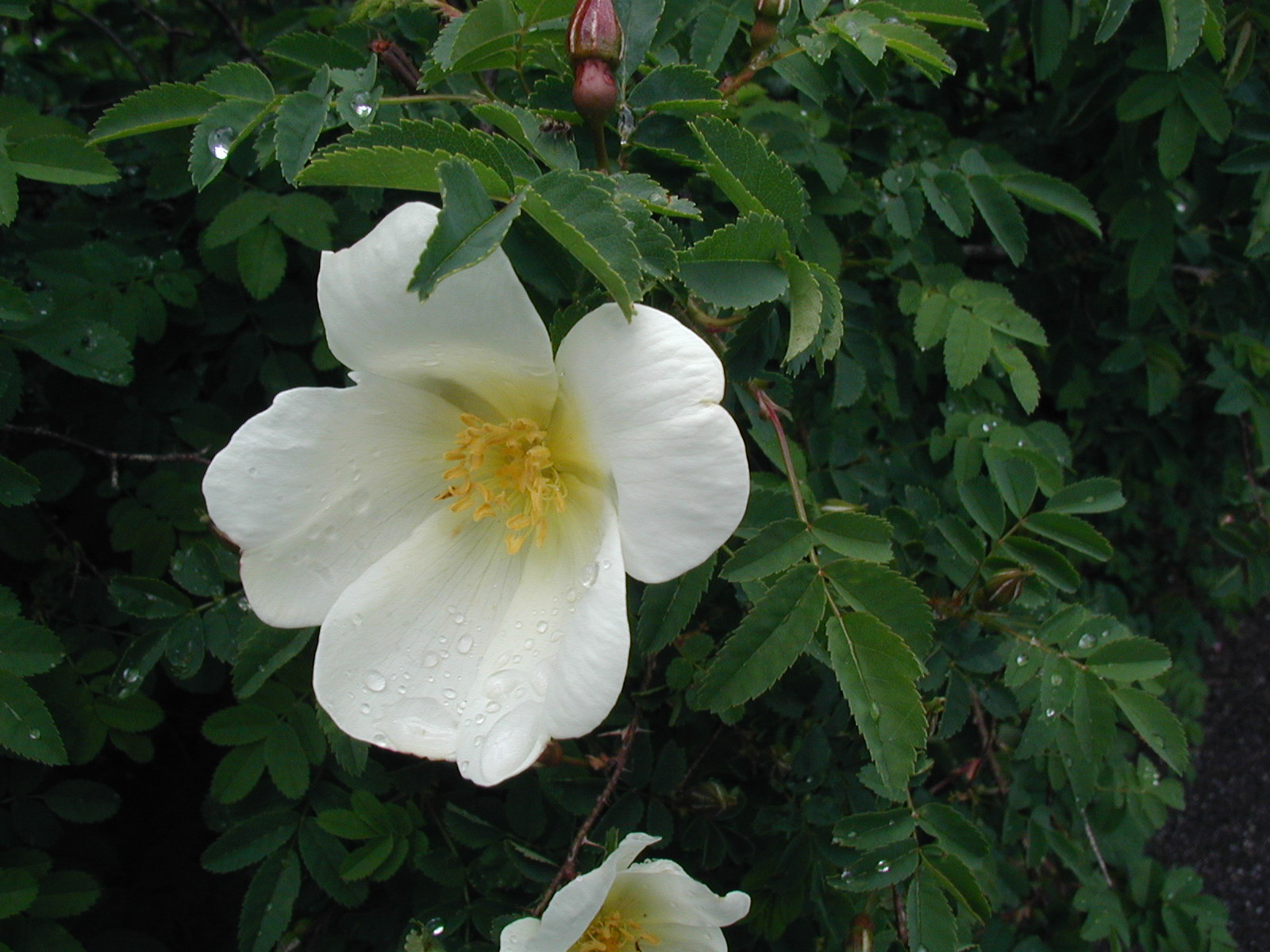
Rosa spinosissima

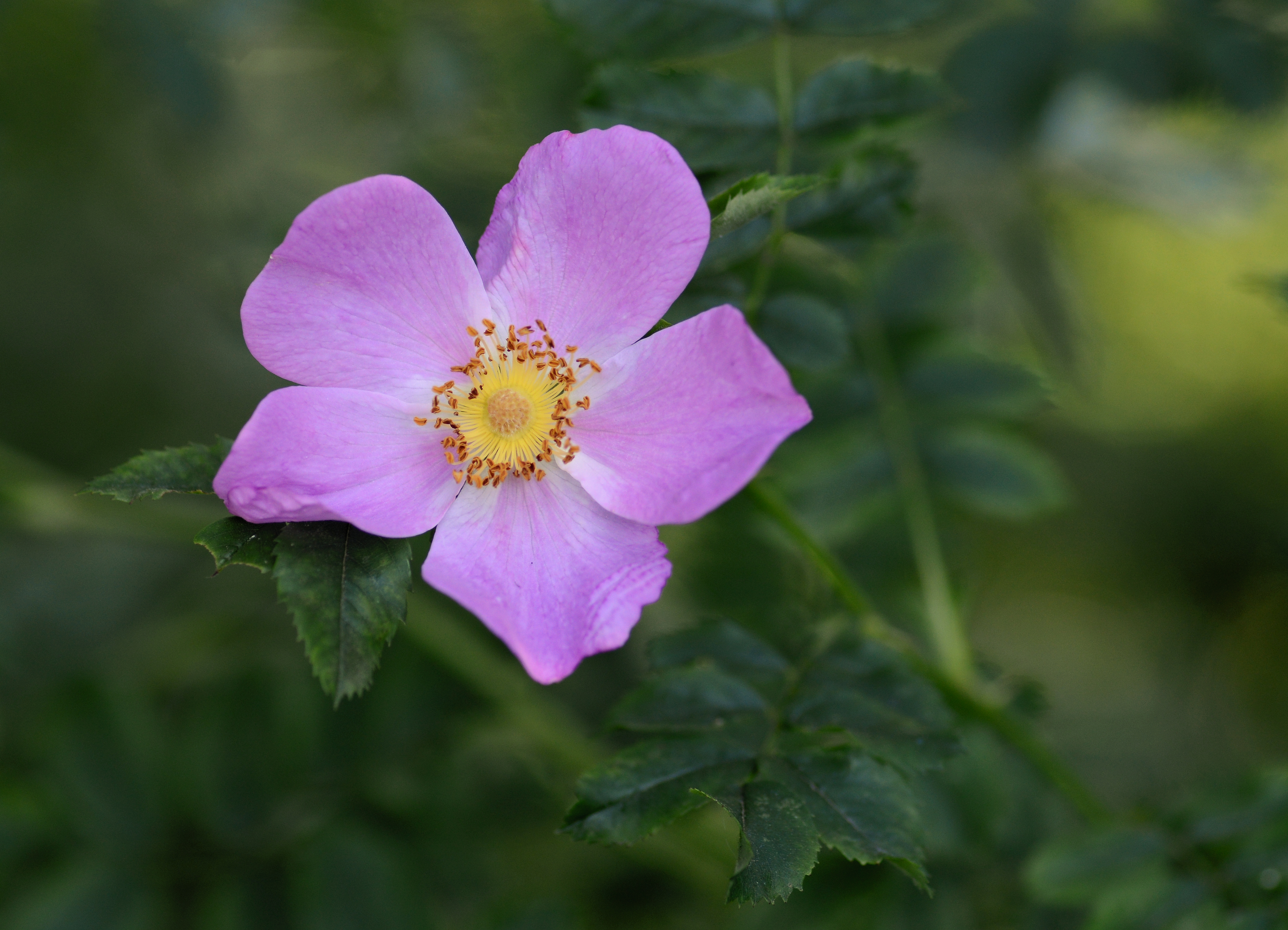
Rosa virginiana

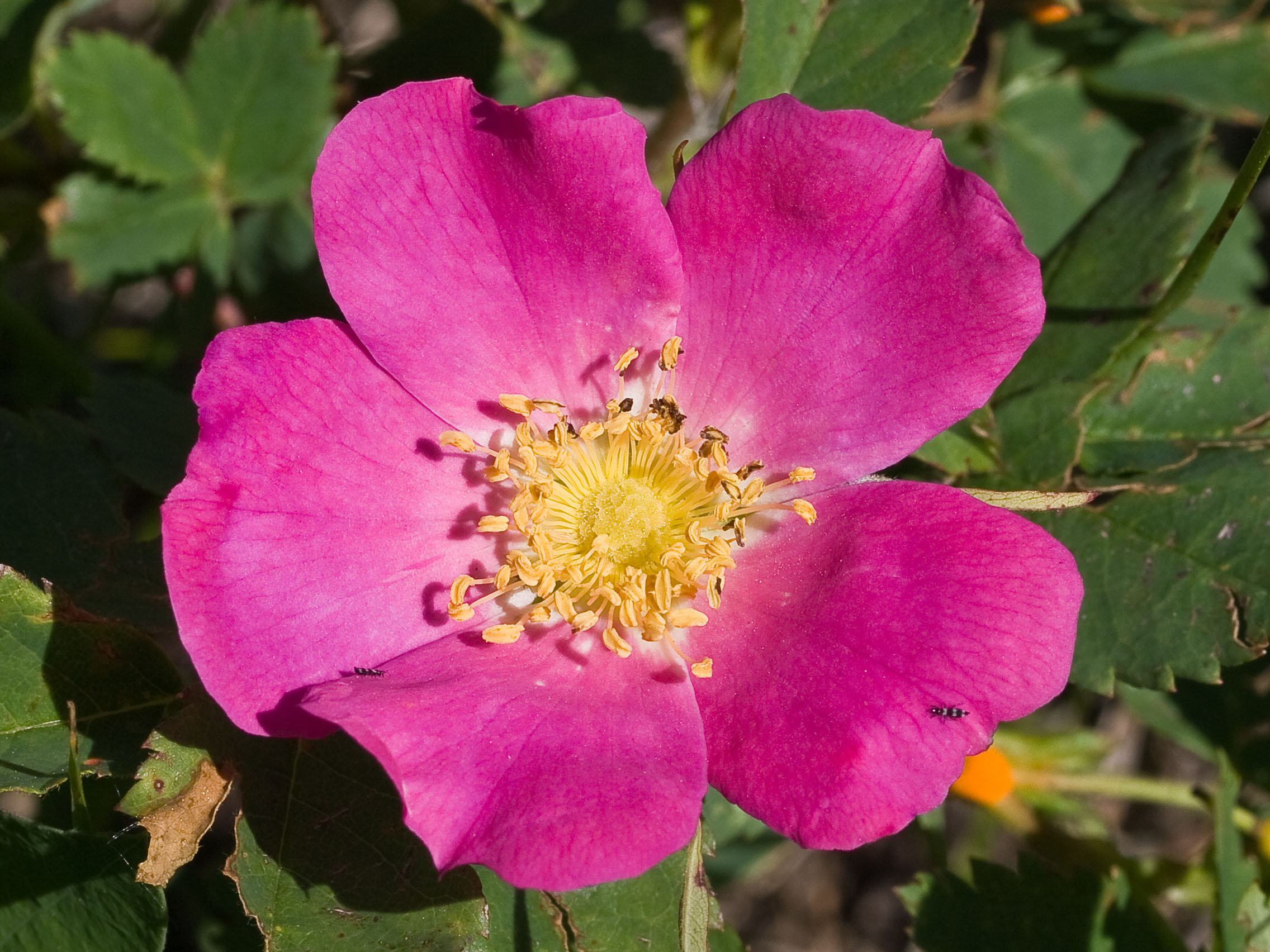
Rosa woodsii

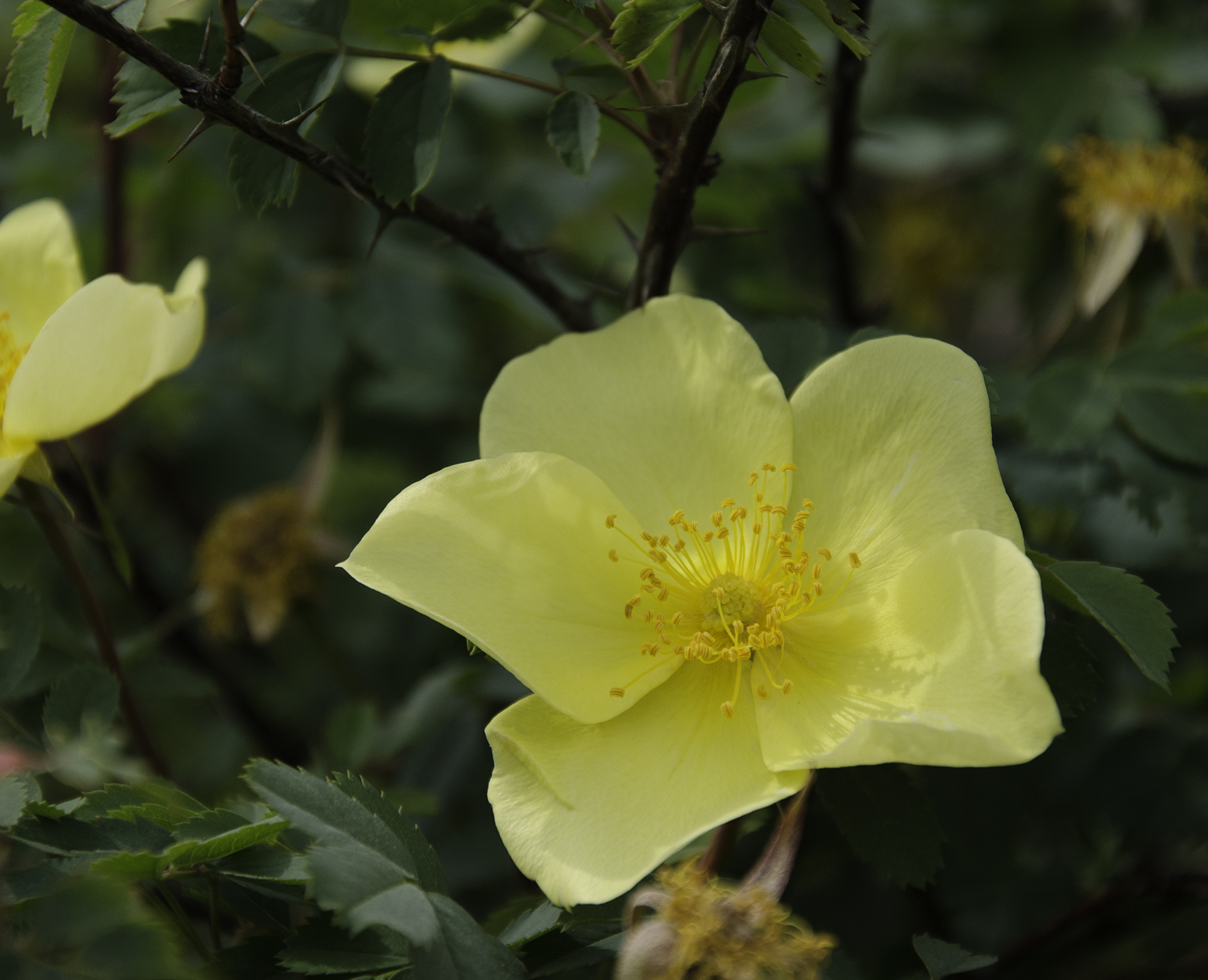
Rosa xanthina

The following species are accepted:

- Rosa abietina Gren. ex Christ
- Rosa abrica Khat. & Koobaz
- Rosa abutalybovii Gadzh.
- Rosa abyssinica R.Br. ex Lindl. – Abyssinian rose, Ethiopian rose, wild Ethiopian rose, African rose
- Rosa achburensis Chrshan.
- Rosa acicularis Lindl. – wild rose, prickly rose, prickly wild rose, bristly rose, Arctic rose (Rosa)
- Rosa adenophylla Galushko
- Rosa agrestis Savi – small-leaved sweet briar, field briar, fieldbriar (Caninae)
- Rosa alabukensis Tkatsch.
- Rosa alberti Regel
- Rosa alexeenkoi Crép. ex Juz.
- Rosa × alpestris Rapin
- Rosa altidaghestanica Husseinov
- Rosa amblyophylla Kult.
- Rosa × andegavensis Bastard
- Rosa arabica (Crép. ex Boiss.) Déségl.
- Rosa × andegavensis Tchubar
- Rosa arensii Juz. & Galushko
- Rosa arkansana Porter – prairie rose, wild prairie rose (Rosa)
- Rosa arvensis Huds. – field rose, white-flowered trailing rose, Shakespeare's musk (Synstylae)
- Rosa × atlantica W.H.Lewis
- Rosa × avrayensis Rouy & E.G.Camus
- Rosa awarica Husseinov
- Rosa baiyushanensis Q.L.Wang
- Rosa balcarica Galushko
- Rosa balsamica Willd.
- Rosa banksiae R.Br. – Lady Banks' rose, Banks' rose
- Rosa banksiopsis Baker
- Rosa × baxanensis Galushko
- Rosa beauvaisii Cardot
- Rosa beggeriana Schrenk – (Gymnocarpae)
- Rosa bella Rehder & E.H.Wilson
- Rosa bellicosa Nevski
- Rosa × belnensis Ozanon
- Rosa × bengyana Rouy & L.C.Lamb.
- Rosa biebersteiniana Tratt.
- Rosa × bigeneris Duffort ex Rouy
- Rosa × binaloudensis Vaezi, Arjmandi & Sharghi
- Rosa × bishopii Wolley-Dod
- Rosa × biturigensis Boreau
- Rosa blanda Aiton – smooth rose, meadow/wild rose, prairie rose
- Rosa boissieri Crép.
- Rosa × bolanderi Greene
- Rosa bracteata J.C.Wendl. – Macartney rose (Bracteatae)
- Rosa bridgesii Crép. ex Rydb. – pygmy rose, Sierran dwarf rose
- Rosa brotherorum Chrshan.
- Rosa brunonii Lindl. – Himalayan musk rose (Synstylae)
- Rosa bugensis Chrshan.
- Rosa buschiana Chrshan.
- Rosa caesia Sm.
- Rosa calantha Tkatsch.
- Rosa calcarea Lipsch. & Sumnev.
- Rosa californica Cham. & Schltdl. – California rose, California wild rose (Rosa)
- Rosa calyptopoda Cardot
- Rosa × bolanderi
- Rosa × canadensis W.H.Lewis
- Rosa canina L. – dog rose (Caninae)
- Rosa carolina L. – Carolina rose, pasture rose, prairie rose (Carolinae)
- Rosa caryophyllacea Besser
- Rosa caudata Baker
- Rosa × caviniacensis Ozanon
- Rosa × centifolia L. – Provence rose, cabbage rose, Rose de Mai
- Rosa chavinii Rapin ex Reut.
- Rosa chengkouensis T.T.Yu & T.C.Ku
- Rosa chinensis Jacq. – Chinese rose, China rose, Bengal rose
- Rosa chionistrae H.Lindb.
- Rosa × churchillii W.H.Lewis
- Rosa cinnamomea L. - Typ. cons.
- Rosa × clinophylla Thory – (Bracteatae)
- Rosa × consanguinea Gren.
- Rosa corymbifera Borkh. – (Caninae)
- Rosa corymbulosa Rolfe
- Rosa × cottetii Lagger & Puget ex Cottet
- Rosa coziae Nyár.
- Rosa cymosa Tratt. - elderflower rose
- Rosa cziragensis Husseinov
- Rosa daishanensis T.C.Ku
- Rosa × damascena Mill. – Damask rose, Bulgarian rose, Persian rose, Taif rose, Arab rose, Ispahan rose, Castile rose
- Rosa darginica Husseinov
- Rosa davidii Crép. – Father David's rose (Rosa)
- Rosa davurica Pall.
- Rosa deqenensis T.C.Ku
- Rosa derongensis T.C.Ku
- Rosa deseglisei Boreau
- Rosa diplodonta Dubovik
- Rosa dolichocarpa Galushko
- Rosa doluchanovii Manden.
- Rosa donetzica Dubovik
- Rosa × dryadea Ripart ex Déségl.
- Rosa dsharkenti Chrshan.
- Rosa dubovikiae Mironova
- Rosa × dulcissima Lunell
- Rosa × dumalis Bechst. – glaucous dog rose
- Rosa × dumetorum Thuill.
- Rosa duplicata T.T.Yu & T.C.Ku
- Rosa ecae Aitch. – (Pimpinellifoliae)
- Rosa elymaitica Boiss. & Hausskn.
- Rosa × engelmannii S.Watson
- Rosa ermanica Manden.
- Rosa facsarii Ker.-Nagy
- Rosa fargesiana Boulenger
- Rosa farreri Stapf ex Cox – Farrer's threepenny-bit rose
- Rosa × fernaldiorum W.H.Lewis
- Rosa filipes Rehder & E.H.Wilson
- Rosa foetida Herrm. – Austrian briar, Austrian copper rose, Persian yellow rose (Pimpinellifoliae)
- Rosa foliolosa Nutt.
- Rosa forrestiana Boulenger
- Rosa freitagii Ziel.
- Rosa fujisanensis (Makino) Makino
- Rosa gadzhievii Chrshan. & Iskend.
- Rosa gallica L. – Gallic rose, French rose, rose of Provins (Gallicanae)
- Rosa galushkoi Demurova
- Rosa gigantea Collett ex Crép.
- Rosa × gilmaniana W.H.Lewis
- Rosa giraldii Crép.
- Rosa glabrifolia C.A.Mey. ex Rupr.
- Rosa glandulososetosa Gadzh.
- Rosa glauca Pourr. – red-leaved rose, redleaf rose
- Rosa × glaucoides Wolley-Dod
- Rosa glomerata Rehder & E.H.Wilson
- Rosa gorenkensis Besser
- Rosa graciliflora Rehder & E.H.Wilson
- Rosa gracilipes Chrshan.
- Rosa × grovesii (Baker) Maskew
- Rosa gymnocarpa Nutt. – dwarf rose, wood rose, bald-hip rose (Gymnocarpae)
- Rosa × hainesii W.H.Lewis
- Rosa × harmsiana W.H.Lewis
- Rosa heckeliana Tratt.
- Rosa helenae Rehder & E.H.Wilson – (Synstylae)
- Rosa hemisphaerica Herrm. – sulphur rose (Pimpinellifoliae)
- Rosa × henryana W.H.Lewis
- Rosa henryi Boulenger
- Rosa hezhangensis T.L.Xu
- Rosa × hibernica Templeton
- Rosa hirtissima Lonacz.
- Rosa hirtula (Regel) Nakai – Hakone rose, sanshou-bara
- Rosa × hodgdonii W.H.Lewis
- Rosa × housei Erlanson
- Rosa × hyogoensis H.Ohba & S.Akiyama
- Rosa iberica Steven ex M.Bieb.
- Rosa iliensis Chrshan.
- Rosa iljinii Chrshan. ex Gadzh.
- Rosa inodora Fr.
- Rosa × involuta Sm.
- Rosa irinae Demurova
- Rosa irysthonica Manden.
- Rosa isaevii Gadzh. & Iskand.
- Rosa × iwara Siebold ex Regel
- Rosa jaroschenkoi Gadzh. & Iskand.
- Rosa juzepczukiana Vassilcz.
- Rosa kamelinii Husseinov
- Rosa karaalmensis Tkatsch.
- Rosa kazarjanii Sosn.
- Rosa khasautensis Galushko
- Rosa kokanica (Regel) Regel ex Juz. – (Pimpinellifoliae)
- Rosa kokijrimensis Tkatsch.
- Rosa koreana Kom.
- Rosa × kotschyana Boiss.
- Rosa kuhitangi Nevski
- Rosa kujmanica Golitsin
- Rosa kunmingensis T.C.Ku
- Rosa kwangtungensis T.T.Yu & H.T.Tsai
- Rosa kweichowensis T.T.Yu & T.C.Ku
- Rosa laevigata Michx. – Cherokee rose (Laevigatae)
- Rosa langyashanica D.C.Zhang & J.Z.Shao
- Rosa lasiosepala F.P.Metcalf
- Rosa laxa Retz. – (Rosa)
- Rosa leschenaultiana (Thory) Wight & Arn.
- Rosa lichiangensis T.T.Yu & T.C.Ku
- Rosa livescens Besser
- Rosa × longicolla Ravaud ex Rouy
- Rosa longicuspis Bertol.
- Rosa longshoushanica L.Q.Zhao & Y.Z.Zhao
- Rosa lucidissima H.Lév.
- Rosa lucieae Franch. & Rochebr. ex Crép. – memorial rose
- Rosa ludingensis T.C.Ku
- Rosa macrophylla Lindl. – big-hip rose (Rosa)
- Rosa mairei H.Lév.
- Rosa majalis Herrm. – cinnamon rose, double cinnamon rose (Rosa)
- Rosa × makinoana H.Ohba
- Rosa mandenovae Gadzh.
- Rosa mandonii Déségl.
- Rosa maracandica Bunge
- Rosa × margerisonii F.Lees
- Rosa marginata Wallr.
- Rosa × massiana W.H.Lewis
- Rosa maximowicziana Regel
- Rosa × medioccidentis W.H.Lewis
- Rosa memoryae W.H.Lewis
- Rosa mesatlantica H.Lindb.
- Rosa micrantha Borrer ex Sm. – small-flowered sweet briar
- Rosa × mikawamontana Mikanagi & H.Ohba
- Rosa minutifolia Engelm. – small-leaved rose, Baja rose, Baja littleleaf rose (Hesperrhodos)
- Rosa × misimensis Nakai
- Rosa miyiensis T.C.Ku
- Rosa × molletorum Hesl.-Harr.
- Rosa × molliformis Wolley-Dod
- Rosa mollis Sm. – small downy-rose
- Rosa × momiyamae H.Ohba
- Rosa montana Chaix
- Rosa morrisonensis Hayata
- Rosa moschata Herrm. – musk rose
- Rosa moyesii Hemsl. & E.H.Wilson – (Rosa)
- Rosa multibracteata Hemsl. & E.H.Wilson – (Rosa)
- Rosa multiflora Thunb. – multiflora rose, many-flowered rose, seven-sisters rose, Japanese rose, Eijitsu rose, baby rose, rambler rose (Synstylae)
- Rosa murielae Rehder & E.H.Wilson
- Rosa nipponensis Crép.
- Rosa nitida Willd. – shining rose (Carolinae)
- Rosa × nitidula Besser
- Rosa × novae-angliae W.H.Lewis
- Rosa nutkana C.Presl – Nootka rose, bristly rose, wild rose
- Rosa obtegens Galushko
- Rosa × odorata (Andrews) Sweet
- Rosa × oldhamii W.H.Lewis
- Rosa × oligocarpa Rydb.
- Rosa omeiensis Rolfe
- Rosa onoei Makino
- Rosa orientalis A.Dupont ex Ser.
- Rosa osmastonii Rawat & Pangtey
- Rosa ossethica Manden.
- Rosa oxyacantha M.Bieb.
- Rosa oxyodon Boiss.
- Rosa × oxyodontoides Galushko
- Rosa × ozcelikii Korkmaz & Kandemir
- Rosa × palustriformis Rydb.
- Rosa palustris Marshall – swamp rose (Carolinae)
- Rosa paniculigera (Makino ex Koidz.) Momiy.
- Rosa × paulii Rehder
- Rosa pedunculata Kult.
- Rosa pendulina L. – Alpine rose, mountain rose
- Rosa persetosa Rolfe
- Rosa persica Michx ex Juss.
- Rosa × pervirens Gren. ex Crép.
- Rosa phoenicia Boiss.
- Rosa pimpinellifolia L. – burnet rose
- Rosa pinetorum A.Heller – pine rose
- Rosa pinnatisepala T.C.Ku
- Rosa × piptocalyx Juz.
- Rosa pisocarpa A.Gray – cluster rose, swamp rose
- Rosa platyacantha Schrenk
- Rosa × polliniana Spreng.
- Rosa popovii Chrshan.
- Rosa pouzinii Tratt.
- Rosa × praegeri Wolley-Dod
- Rosa praelucens Bijh.
- Rosa praetermissa Galushko
- Rosa prattii Hemsl.
- Rosa pricei Hayata
- Rosa primula Boulenger – incense rose (Pimpinellifoliae)
- Rosa prokhanovii Galushko
- Rosa pseudobanksiae T.T.Yu & T.C.Ku
- Rosa × pseudorusticana Crép. ex W.M.Rogers
- Rosa pseudoscabriuscula (R.Keller) Henker & G.Schulze
- Rosa pubicaulis Galushko
- Rosa × pulcherrima Koidz.
- Rosa pulverulenta M.Bieb.
- Rosa × reversa Waldst. & Kit.
- Rosa rhaetica Gremli
- Rosa roopiae Lonacz.
- Rosa × rothschildii Druce
- Rosa × rouyana Duffort ex Rouy
- Rosa roxburghii Tratt. – chestnut rose, burr rose (Platyrhodon)
- Rosa rubiginosa L. – sweetbriar rose, sweet briar, sweet brier, eglantine (Caninae)
- Rosa rubus H.Lév. & Vaniot
- Rosa rugosa Thunb. – rugosa rose, beach rose, Japanese rose, Ramanas rose, letchberry (Rosa)
- Rosa russanovii Tkatsch.
- Rosa × sabinii J.Woods
- Rosa × salaevensis Rapin
- Rosa sambucina Koidz.
- Rosa saturata Baker
- Rosa saundersiae Rolfe
- Rosa × scabriuscula Winch ex Sm.
- Rosa schergiana Boiss.
- Rosa schrenkiana Crép.
- Rosa sempervirens L. – evergreen rose (Synstylae)
- Rosa serafinii Viv.
- Rosa sericea Lindl. – silky rose (Pimpinellifoliae)
- Rosa sertata Rolfe
- Rosa setigera Michx. – climbing rose, climbing wild rose, prairie rose (Synstylae)
- Rosa setipoda Hemsl. & E.H.Wilson
- Rosa shangchengensis T.C.Ku
- Rosa sherardii Davies
- Rosa sikangensis T.T.Yu & T.C.Ku
- Rosa sinobiflora T.C.Ku
- Rosa sogdiana Tkatsch.
- Rosa soulieana Crép. – (Synstylae)
- Rosa × spinulifolia Dematra
- Rosa spithamea S.Watson
- Rosa squarrosa (A.Rau) Boreau
- Rosa stellata Wooton – star rose, desert rose, gooseberry rose (Hesperrhodos)
- Rosa stylosa Desv.
- Rosa subbuschiana Husseinov
- Rosa × suberecta (Woods) Ley
- Rosa × suberectiformis Wolley-Dod
- Rosa × subpomifera Chrshan.
- Rosa taiwanensis Nakai
- Rosa taronensis T.T.Yu & T.C.Ku
- Rosa teberdensis Chrshan.
- Rosa terscolensis Galushko
- Rosa tianschanica Juz.
- Rosa tibetica T.T.Yu & T.C.Ku
- Rosa tlaratensis Husseinov
- Rosa × toddiae Wolley-Dod
- Rosa tomentosa Sm. – harsh downy-rose
- Rosa transcaucasica Manden.
- Rosa transmorrisonensis Hayata
- Rosa tschimganica Raikova ex Sumnev.
- Rosa tsinlingensis Pax & K.Hoffm.
- Rosa tunquinensis Crép.
- Rosa turcica Rouy
- Rosa turkestanica Regel
- Rosa uniflora Galushko
- Rosa uniflorella Buzunova
- Rosa usischensis Husseinov
- Rosa vassilczenkoi Tkatsch.
- Rosa × verticillacantha Mérat
- Rosa × victoriana W.H.Lewis
- Rosa villosa L. – apple rose
- Rosa virginiana Mill. – Virginia rose, common wild rose, prairie rose
- Rosa × vituperabilis Duffort ex Rouy
- Rosa × waitziana Waitz ex Tratt.
- Rosa × warleyensis E.Willm.
- Rosa webbiana Wall. ex Royle – Webb's rose, thorny rose, prairie rose
- Rosa weisiensis T.T.Yu & T.C.Ku
- Rosa willmottiae Hemsl. – Miss Willmott's rose, Willmott's rose (Gymnocarpae)
- Rosa woodsii Lindl. – Woods' rose, interior rose, mountain rose, pear-hip rose, common wild rose, prairie rose
- Rosa xanthina Lindl. – yellow rose, Manchu rose
- Rosa zalana Wiesb.
- Rosa zaramagensis Demurova
- Rosa zhongdianensis T.C.Ku
- Rosa zuvandica Gadzh.

== See also ==
- Garden roses
- Rose garden
- Rose trial grounds
- ADR rose
- Rose show
- List of Award of Garden Merit roses
- List of rose cultivars named after people
- List of Rosa species of the Balkans
