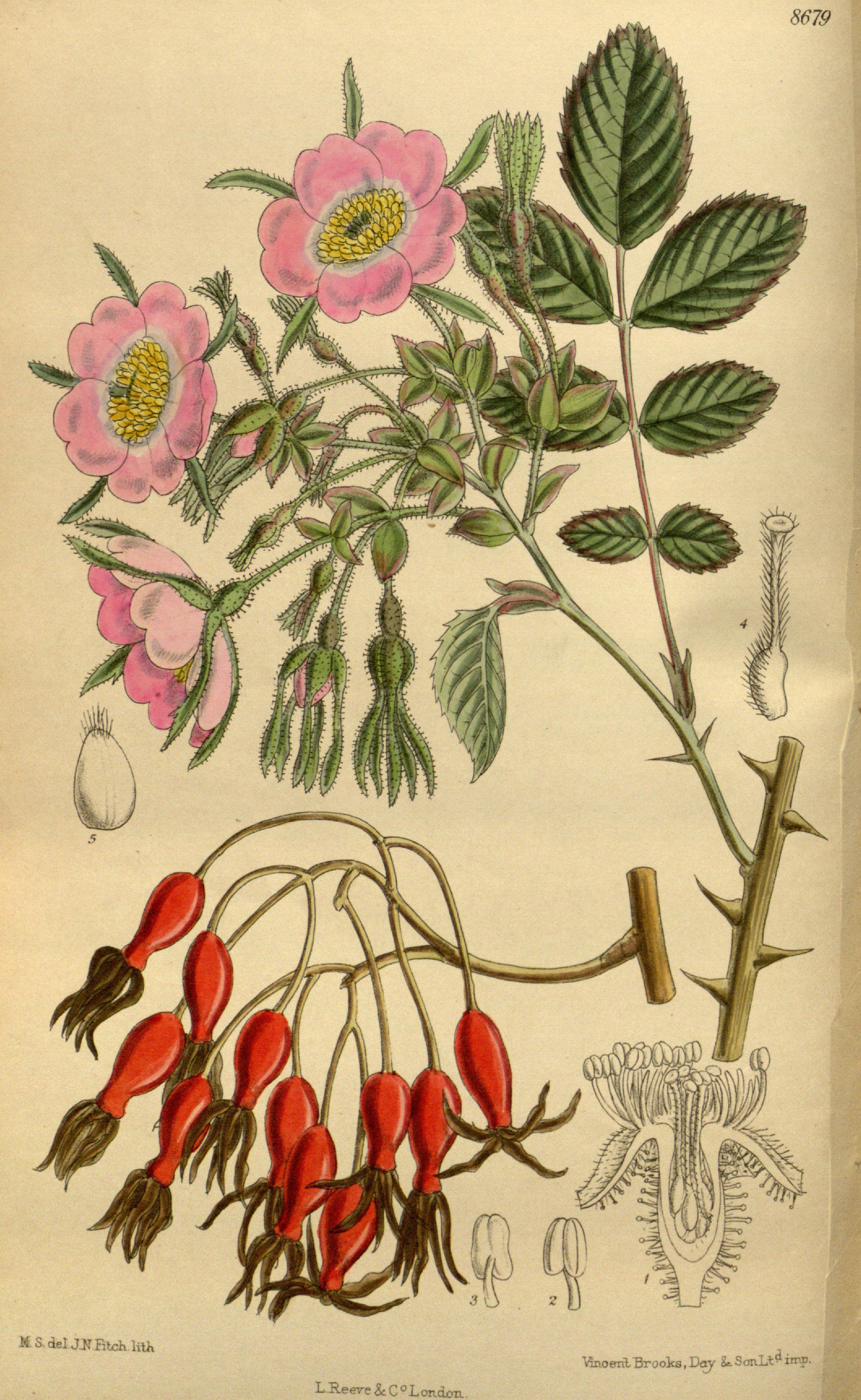

Scientific classification
- Kingdom: Plantae
- Clade: Tracheophytes
- Clade: Angiosperms
- Clade: Eudicots
- Clade: Rosids
- Order: Rosales
- Family: Rosaceae
- Genus: Rosa
- Species: R. davidii

Binomial name
- Rosa davidii Crép.

Synonyms
- Rosa macrophylla var. davidii (Crép.) P.V.Heath; Rosa roseomoyesii subsp. davidii (Crép.) G.Täckh.

= Rosa davidii =

Species of flowering plant

Rosa davidii also known as Father David's rose, is a rose species in the family Rosaceae, originating from western to central China and South-East Tibet in altitudes between 1600 and 3000 m above sea level.

== Description ==
Rosa davidii is a winter hardy shrub, growing to a maximum height of 4 metres (13 ft). The narrow imparipinnate leaves have a length of 7 to 14 cm (2.8 to 5.5 in) and generally consist of seven or nine - rarely five or eleven - leaflets. Prickles are sparse to scattered along the stalks.

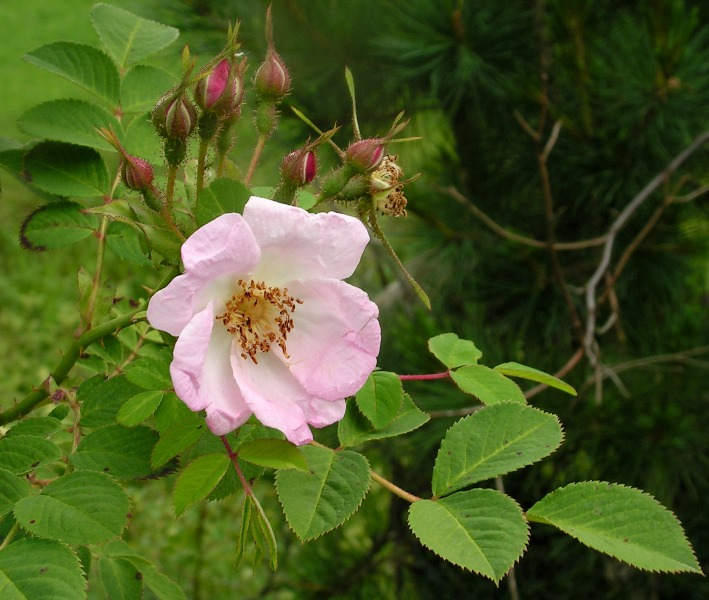

R. davidii is once blooming and has small, pink flowers with an average diameter of 2 to 4 cm (0.79 to 1.57 in). The flowers have five petals and appear in clusters of four to twelve. Its scarlet red rose hips are bottle shaped and up to 2.5 cm (0.98 in) long, and seem to be even longer due to old sepals remaining on their tips.
