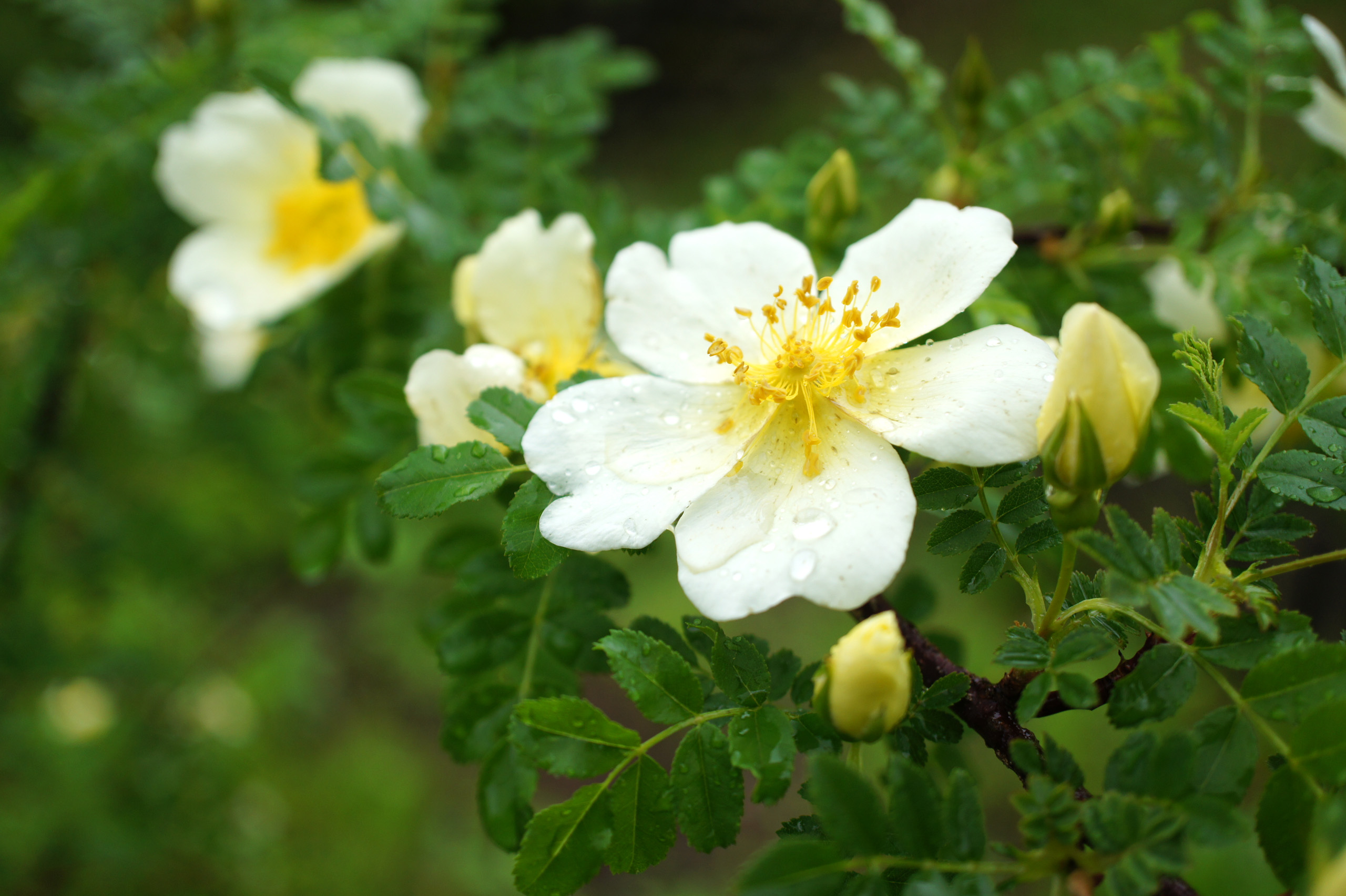

Scientific classification
- Kingdom: Plantae
- Clade: Tracheophytes
- Clade: Angiosperms
- Clade: Eudicots
- Clade: Rosids
- Order: Rosales
- Family: Rosaceae
- Genus: Rosa
- Species: R. primula

Binomial name
- Rosa primula Boulenger

= Rosa primula =

Species of plant

Rosa primula, also known as the incense rose, is a species of wild shrub rose that originated in China and Turkestan.

== Description ==
When full grown, R. primula will reach a height of 5-6 feet and a spread of 4-5 feet. It is best planted from November-May, and requires full sun and moist, free-draining soil. When it blooms in late spring, it produces small, single yellow flowers, which are followed by reddish-brown hips. The flowers and the foliage are aromatic.

Rosa primula is a thorned species. Its leaves are double serrated and glandular, similar to R. ecae and R. foetida, and have been described as fern-like.

== See also ==
- List of Rosa species
