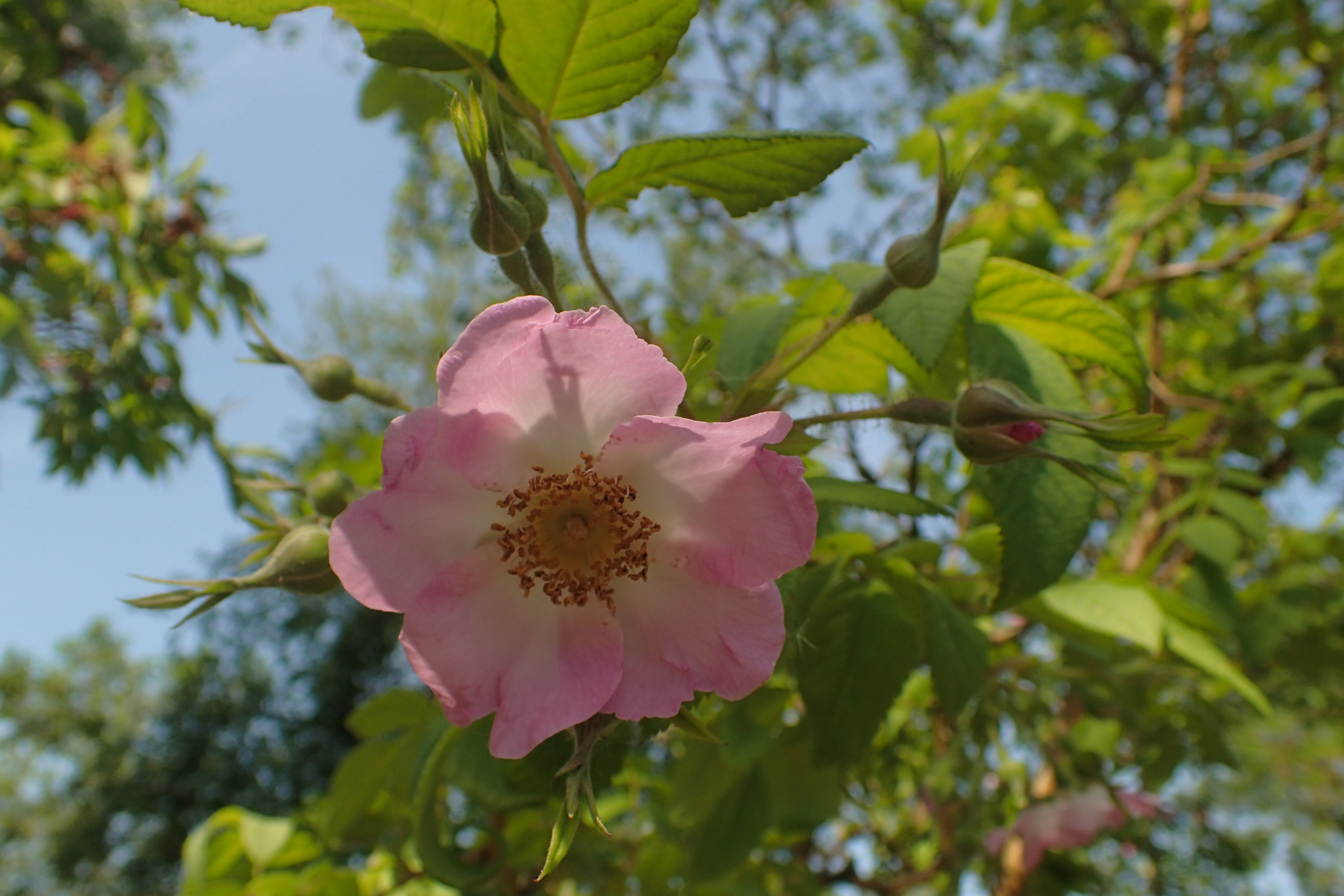

Scientific classification
- Kingdom: Plantae
- Clade: Embryophytes
- Clade: Tracheophytes
- Clade: Spermatophytes
- Clade: Angiosperms
- Clade: Eudicots
- Clade: Rosids
- Order: Rosales
- Family: Rosaceae
- Genus: Rosa
- Species: R. caudata

Binomial name
- Rosa caudata Baker

= Rosa caudata =

Species of flowering plant

Rosa caudata is a species of flowering plant in the family Rosaceae. It belongs to the genus Rosa and grows as a small tree in temperate environments. The species is native to China, where it occurs in the provinces of Hubei, Shaanxi, and Sichuan.

Rosa caudata was first published in Rosa 2:495 (1914) by the botanist John Gilbert Baker. The species has two accepted varieties, Rosa caudata var. caudata and Rosa caudata var. maxima, both of which grow as trees. The species has two recorded vernacular names: ruža chvostíkatá in Slovak and 尾萼薔薇 (wei e qiang wei) in Chinese.
