= Rosa awarica =

Scientific classification
- Kingdom: Plantae
- Clade: Embryophytes
- Clade: Tracheophytes
- Clade: Spermatophytes
- Clade: Angiosperms
- Clade: Eudicots
- Clade: Rosids
- Order: Rosales
- Family: Rosaceae
- Genus: Rosa
- Species: R. awarica

Binomial name
- Rosa awarica Husseinov

Species of flowering plant

Rosa awarica is a species of flowering plant in the family Rosaceae. It is native to the Caucasus region, where it grows as a shrub in temperate environments. The species was first published in Botanicheskii Zhurnal by the botanist Husseinov.
