= Rosa × canadensis =

Scientific classification
- Kingdom: Plantae
- Clade: Tracheophytes
- Clade: Angiosperms
- Clade: Eudicots
- Clade: Rosids
- Order: Rosales
- Family: Rosaceae
- Genus: Rosa
- Species: R. × canadensis

Binomial name
- Rosa × canadensis W.H.Lewis

Species of flowering plant

Rosa × canadensis, the Canada rose, is a hybrid species of flowering plant in the family Rosaceae. It belongs to the genus Rosa and grows as a deciduous shrub in subpolar and temperate environments. The hybrid is native to subarctic regions of North America and parts of the northern United States. The parentage of this hybrid is Rosa acicularis × Rosa woodsii.

The name Rosa × canadensis was first published in Novon 25:27 (2016) by W. H. Lewis.
