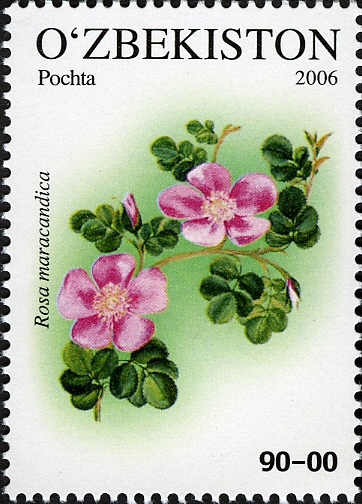

Scientific classification
- Kingdom: Plantae
- Clade: Embryophytes
- Clade: Tracheophytes
- Clade: Spermatophytes
- Clade: Angiosperms
- Clade: Eudicots
- Clade: Rosids
- Order: Rosales
- Family: Rosaceae
- Genus: Rosa
- Species: R. maracandica

Binomial name
- Rosa maracandica Bunge

= Rosa maracandica =

Species of plant

Rosa maracandica is a species of flowering plant. This species is native to much of western Asia.
