= Rosa alabukensis =

Scientific classification
- Kingdom: Plantae
- Clade: Tracheophytes
- Clade: Angiosperms
- Clade: Eudicots
- Clade: Rosids
- Order: Rosales
- Family: Rosaceae
- Genus: Rosa
- Species: R. alabukensis

Binomial name
- Rosa alabukensis Tkatsch.

Species of flowering plant

Rosa alabukensis is a species of flowering plant in the genus Rosa, in the rose family. It is native to Kyrgyzstan.

The species was first described by the botanist Vаssilij Ignatjevich Tkatschenko.
