= Rosa buschiana =

Conservation status
- Least Concern (IUCN 3.1)

Scientific classification
- Kingdom: Plantae
- Clade: Embryophytes
- Clade: Tracheophytes
- Clade: Spermatophytes
- Clade: Angiosperms
- Clade: Eudicots
- Clade: Rosids
- Order: Rosales
- Family: Rosaceae
- Genus: Rosa
- Species: R. buschiana

Binomial name
- Rosa buschiana Chrshan

Species of flowering plant

Rosa buschiana is a species of flowering plant in the family Rosaceae. It belongs to the genus Rosa and grows as a deciduous shrub in temperate environments. The species is native to the regions of Transcaucasia and Ciscaucasia. It was first published in Botaničeskie Materialy Gerbariya Botanicheskogo Instituta Komarova Akademii Nauk S.S.S.R. 14:192 (1951).

== Taxonomy ==
Rosa buschiana is known by several vernacular names. Two officially recognized common names are "Askil" and "Shrub Rose". In Russian, the species is known as "Шиповник Буша" (Shipovnik Busha), which is sometimes translated into English as "Busch's Rose". These names are used in regional floras and botanical literature referring to the species.

== Distribution ==
Rosa buschiana is typically found at elevations between 2,000 and 2,500 m (6,600 and 8,200 ft) above sea level. It is most commonly encountered in mountainous regions of Russia, where it grows on slopes and within highland habitats. However, the species is not restricted to mountainous areas and has also been recorded in parts of the grasslands of Georgia, where it occurs in flatter terrain.

== Flowering period ==
This species blooms from June to October, with the peak flowering period occurring in August.

== Conservation status ==
According to the International Union for Conservation of Nature Red List, this species is classified as least concern (LC). This status indicates that the species is not currently considered to be at significant risk of extinction across its known range.
