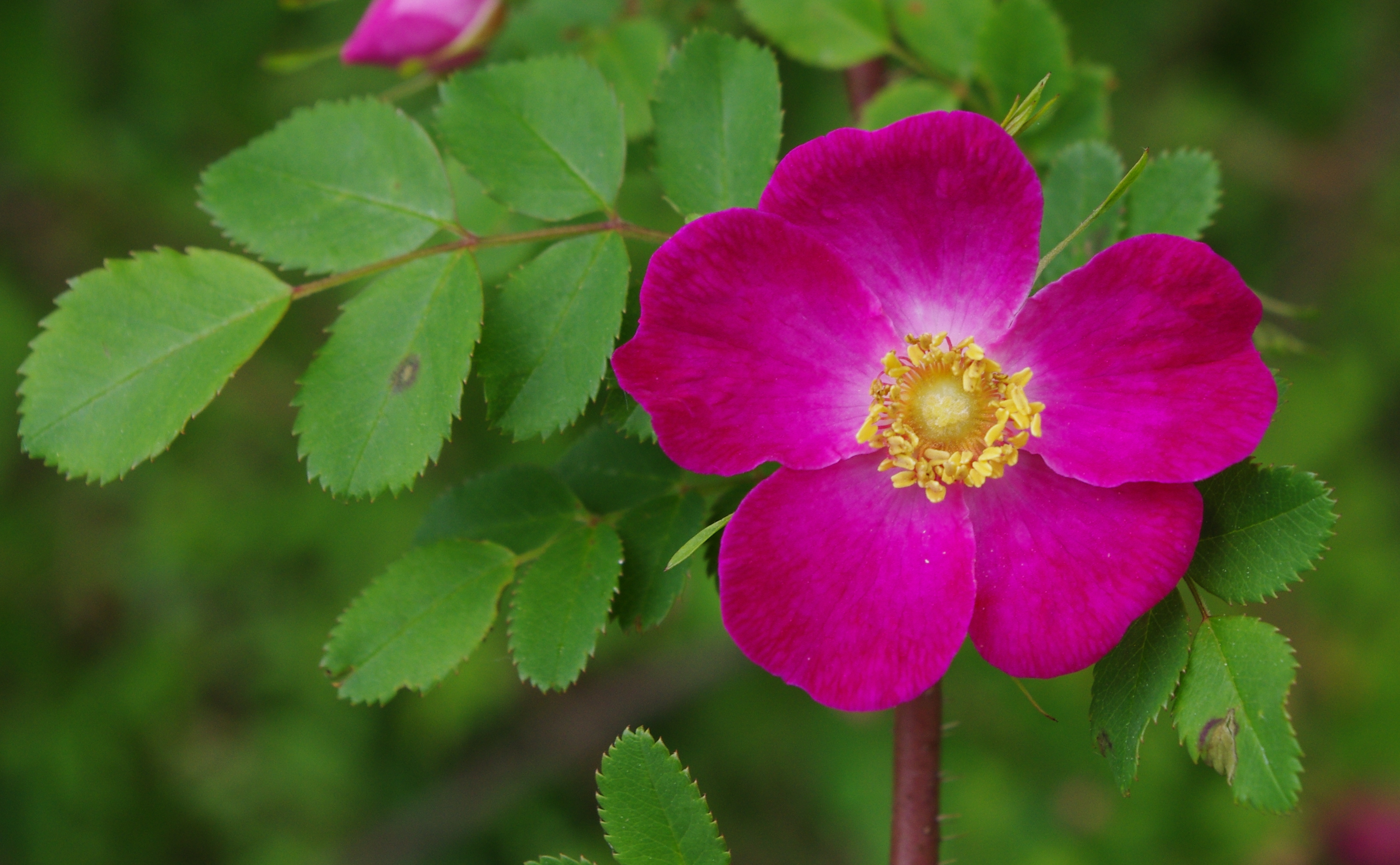

Scientific classification
- Kingdom: Plantae
- Clade: Tracheophytes
- Clade: Angiosperms
- Clade: Eudicots
- Clade: Rosids
- Order: Rosales
- Family: Rosaceae
- Genus: Rosa
- Species: R. prattii

Binomial name
- Rosa prattii Hemsl.

= Rosa prattii =

Species of flowering plant

Rosa prattii is a species of wild rose in the family Rosaceae. It is native to China. It is a shrub that grows up to 2.5 metres (8.2 feet) tall. Flowers have five petals and are pink in color.
