= Rosa bugensis =

Scientific classification
- Kingdom: Plantae
- Clade: Tracheophytes
- Clade: Angiosperms
- Clade: Eudicots
- Clade: Rosids
- Order: Rosales
- Family: Rosaceae
- Genus: Rosa
- Species: R. bugensis

Binomial name
- Rosa bugensis Chrshan.

Species of plant

Rosa bugensis is a species of flowering plant in the family Rosaceae. It is a shrub that can be up to 80 cm tall. The leaves are usually 30–35 cm long and 20–25 mm wide, with 20–25 mm long pedicles. The plant blossoms in May and June, and is native to western Ukraine.
