= Rosa baiyushanensis =

Scientific classification
- Kingdom: Plantae
- Clade: Tracheophytes
- Clade: Angiosperms
- Clade: Eudicots
- Clade: Rosids
- Order: Rosales
- Family: Rosaceae
- Genus: Rosa
- Species: R. baiyushanensis

Binomial name
- Rosa baiyushanensis Q.L.Wang

Species of flowering plant

Rosa baiyushanensis is a species of flowering plant in the family Rosaceae. It belongs to the genus Rosa and is a shrub.

This species is native to northeastern China, where it is primarily found in the provinces of Liaoning, Jilin, and Heilongjiang. It typically grows in temperate habitats such as forest margins, hillsides, and shrublands. It was first described and published in Bulletin of Botanical Research by Qing Li Wang.
