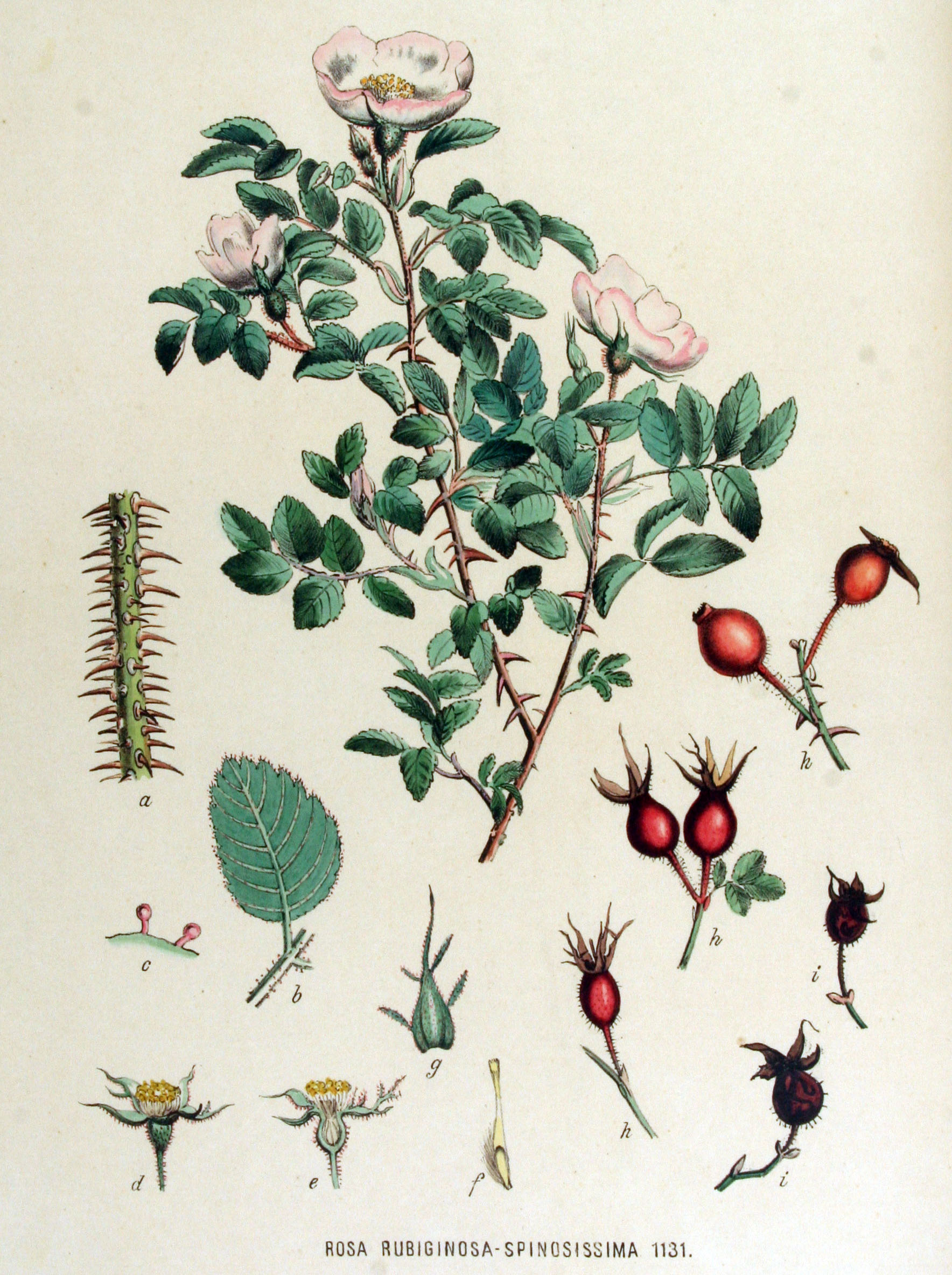
- Rosa rubiginosa a parent species of Rosa × biturigensis

Scientific classification
- Kingdom: Plantae
- Clade: Tracheophytes
- Clade: Angiosperms
- Clade: Eudicots
- Clade: Rosids
- Order: Rosales
- Family: Rosaceae
- Genus: Rosa
- Species: R. × biturigensis

Binomial name
- Rosa × biturigensis Boreau

= Rosa × biturigensis =

Hybrid species of flowering plant

Rosa × biturigensis is a hybrid species of rose in the family Rosaceae. It belongs to the genus Rosa and grows as a deciduous shrub in temperate environments. The hybrid is the result of a cross between Rosa rubiginosa and Rosa spinosissima, giving it the formula R. rubiginosa × R. spinosissima. It is native to parts of Europe, particularly Great Britain, France, and Ireland. It was first published in Flore du Centre de la France, 2nd edition, volume 2, page 630, in 1849.

== Taxonomy ==
Like many other wild roses, Rosa × biturigensis has a complicated taxonomic history. Over time, it was described under several different names by various botanists, largely due to its variable appearance and the difficulty of interpreting natural hybrids within the genus Rosa. In total, the taxon has five accepted synonyms: three are alternative hybrid names, while the remaining two are treated as varieties.

== Distribution ==
This hybrid is encountered in the United Kingdom, France, and Ireland. Outside its main range, it has also been recorded in southern Spain, particularly in the region of Andalusia. Additional occurrences have been noted in eastern Germany, near the border between Belgium and France, and along the coastal regions of the Netherlands.
