= Rosa caryophyllacea =

Scientific classification
- Kingdom: Plantae
- Clade: Embryophytes
- Clade: Tracheophytes
- Clade: Spermatophytes
- Clade: Angiosperms
- Clade: Eudicots
- Clade: Rosids
- Order: Rosales
- Family: Rosaceae
- Genus: Rosa
- Species: R. caryophyllacea

Binomial name
- Rosa caryophyllacea Besser

Synonyms
- List: Rosa caryophyllacea f. typica Christ; Rosa caryophyllacea var. typica Heinr.Braun; Rosa glauca var. caryophyllacea (Besser) Schmalh.; Rosa rubiginosa var. caryophyllacea (Besser) Ser.; Rosa tomentella var. caryophyllacea (Besser) Grossh.; Rosa caryophyllacea f. ambiglauca Kupcsok ex R.Keller; Rosa caryophyllacea var. blockii Chrshan.; Rosa caryophyllacea var. bonchidae R.Keller; Rosa caryophyllacea f. calva Christ; Rosa caryophyllacea var. durandensis R.Keller; Rosa caryophyllacea f. firmicaulis (Kupcsok) R.Keller; Rosa caryophyllacea subvar. flavescens Kmet ex R.Keller; Rosa caryophyllacea f. formosa Kupcsok ex R.Keller; Rosa caryophyllacea f. friesiana Christ; Rosa caryophyllacea var. gypsicola (Błocki) R.Keller; Rosa caryophyllacea f. hirta Christ; Rosa caryophyllacea var. lonaczewskii Litv. ex Chrshan.; Rosa caryophyllacea f. micranthoides Kupcsok ex R.Keller; Rosa caryophyllacea f. mysterica Kupcsok ex R.Keller; Rosa caryophyllacea var. notabilis (Kupcsok) R.Keller; Rosa caryophyllacea var. nyaradyi R.Keller; Rosa caryophyllacea f. persiana Borbás ex R.Keller; Rosa caryophyllacea f. piersiana (Borbás) R.Keller; Rosa caryophyllacea var. pinetorum R.Keller; Rosa caryophyllacea f. puberula R.Keller; Rosa caryophyllacea f. pycnadenia Kupcsok ex R.Keller; Rosa caryophyllacea f. ruszkinensis R.Keller; Rosa caryophyllacea var. scepusiensis (Borbás) Formánek; Rosa caryophyllacea f. scepusiensis Borbás; Rosa caryophyllacea f. slavonica Kupcsok; Rosa caryophyllacea f. stuporata Kupcsok ex R.Keller; Rosa caryophyllacea var. suecica Matsson; Rosa caryophyllacea var. temeraria (Kupcsok) R.Keller; Rosa caryophyllacea var. vera Błocki ex R.Keller; Rosa caryophyllacea f. zajartakrivularis (Kupcsok) R.Keller; Rosa firmicaulis Kupcsok; Rosa gypsicola Błocki; Rosa notabilis Kupcsok; Rosa pinetorum Kupcsok; Rosa temeraria Kupcsok; Rosa wagae Piotr.; Rosa zajartakrivularis Kupcsok; Rosa zalana var. piersiana Borbás

Species of flowering plant

Rosa caryophyllacea is a species of flowering plant in the family Rosaceae. It belongs to the genus Rosa and grows as a shrub in temperate environments.

The name Rosa caryophyllacea was first published in Catalogus Horti Botanici Krzemieniecensis, supplement 4:18 (1815) by Besser.

This species is native to regions extending from east-central Europe through south-eastern Europe to North Caucasus.
