= Rosa × atlantica =

Scientific classification
- Kingdom: Plantae
- Clade: Tracheophytes
- Clade: Angiosperms
- Clade: Eudicots
- Clade: Rosids
- Order: Rosales
- Family: Rosaceae
- Genus: Rosa
- Species: R. × atlantica

Binomial name
- Rosa × atlantica W.H.Lewis

Species of flowering plant

Rosa × atlantica is a hybrid species of flowering plant belonging to the Rosaceae family. This rose originated from a natural cross between Rosa palustris and Rosa carolina, giving it the hybrid formula R. palustris × R. carolina. The hybrid is native to Pennsylvania in the United States. Like many other roses, it develops as a shrub and is adapted to the temperate environments. It was described in 2016 and published in Novon by W. H. Lewis.
