= Rosa × bolanderi =

Scientific classification
- Kingdom: Plantae
- Clade: Tracheophytes
- Clade: Angiosperms
- Clade: Eudicots
- Clade: Rosids
- Order: Rosales
- Family: Rosaceae
- Genus: Rosa
- Species: R. × bolanderi

Binomial name
- Rosa × bolanderi Greene

Hybrid species of flowering plant

Rosa × bolanderi is a hybrid species of rose in the family Rosaceae. It belongs to the genus Rosa and grows as shrub in temperate environments. The species is native to the United States, specifically California. It was first published in Leaflets of Botanical Observation and Criticism 2:261 (1912).

== Taxonomy ==
Like some other wild roses, Rosa × bolanderi has had a somewhat complex taxonomic history. It has 1 accepted synonym: Rosa californica var. orthocantha. Since its original publication under the same name in 1912, it was later interpreted differently by some botanists. In 1851, it was described under this synonym in Abhandlungen der Königlichen Böhmischen Gesellschaft der Wissenschaften, series 5, volume 6, page 202.

== Distribution ==
This hybrid species is native to the state of California. However, it has also been encountered outside its native range, including in the state of Missouri, specifically in the St. Louis north county and city area just west of the Mississippi River, as well as in the Metro East region of Illinois. In Illinois, it has been recorded in Madison County, Illinois and St. Clair County, Illinois, particularly near Granite City, Illinois and Collinsville, Illinois.
