= Rosa calyptopoda =

Scientific classification
- Kingdom: Plantae
- Clade: Embryophytes
- Clade: Tracheophytes
- Clade: Spermatophytes
- Clade: Angiosperms
- Clade: Eudicots
- Clade: Rosids
- Order: Rosales
- Family: Rosaceae
- Genus: Rosa
- Species: R. calyptopoda

Binomial name
- Rosa calyptopoda Cardot

Species of flowering plant

Rosa calyptopoda is a species of flowering plant in the family Rosaceae. It belongs to the genus Rosa and grows as a deciduous shrub. The species is native to China, specifically Sichuan. The name Rosa calyptopoda was first published in Notulae Systematicae (Paris) 3:270 (1917).

== Taxonomy ==
Rosa calyptopoda is also known by its Chinese vernacular name 短腳薔薇 which means short-stalked rose.
