= Rosa arensii =

Scientific classification
- Kingdom: Plantae
- Clade: Embryophytes
- Clade: Tracheophytes
- Clade: Spermatophytes
- Clade: Angiosperms
- Clade: Eudicots
- Clade: Rosids
- Order: Rosales
- Family: Rosaceae
- Genus: Rosa
- Species: R. arensii

Binomial name
- Rosa arensii Juz. & Galushko

Species of flowering plant

Rosa arensii is a species of flowering plant in the family Rosaceae. It is native to the Caucasus region, where it occurs primarily in temperate habitat. Like most species of the genus Rosa, it grows as a shrub.
