= Rosa chavinii =

Scientific classification
- Kingdom: Plantae
- Clade: Embryophytes
- Clade: Tracheophytes
- Clade: Spermatophytes
- Clade: Angiosperms
- Clade: Eudicots
- Clade: Rosids
- Order: Rosales
- Family: Rosaceae
- Genus: Rosa
- Species: R. chavinii

Binomial name
- Rosa chavinii Rapin ex Reut.

Synonyms
- List: Rosa canina var. chavinii (Rapin ex Reut.) Rhiner; Rosa communis subsp. chavinii (Rapin ex Reut.) Rouy & E.G.Camus; Rosa glauca subsp. chavinii (Rapin ex Reut.) E.P.Perrier; Rosa glauca subsp. chavinii (Rapin ex Reut.) E.P.Perrier; Rosa montana f. chavinii (Rapin ex Reut.) Christ; Rosa montana var. chavinii (Rapin ex Reut.) Burnat & Gremli; Rosa montana subsp. chavinii (Rapin ex Reut.) Arcang.; Rosa rubrifolia f. chavinii (Rapin ex Reut.) H.Waldner; Rosa chavinii Chaix; Rosa chavinii var. aretiana Cornaz ex R.Keller; Rosa chavinii var. cornazii Dingler; Rosa chavinii subvar. cuneata (Christ) R.Keller; Rosa chavinii var. gaillardii Christ; Rosa chavinii subvar. laggeri (Puget ex Déségl.) R.Keller; Rosa chavinii subvar. latibractea (Christ) R.Keller; Rosa chavinii subvar. longipedunculata (Christ) R.Keller; Rosa chavinii var. mutata (Burnat & Gremli) Burnat; Rosa chavinii var. puberula R.Keller; Rosa chavinii var. pycnadena Christ; Rosa chavinii var. pycnadenia Christ; Rosa chavinii var. transitoria R.Keller; Rosa chavinii var. typica R.Keller; Rosa communis var. brizoniana Rouy & E.G.Camus; Rosa communis var. latibractea (Christ) Rouy & E.G.Camus; Rosa communis var. mutata (Burnat & Gremli) Rouy & E.G.Camus; Rosa glauca var. mutata Burnat & Gremli; Rosa glauca subsp. mutata (Burnat ex Gremli) Arcang.; Rosa laggeri Puget ex Déségl.; Rosa montana f. cuneata Christ; Rosa montana f. latibractea Christ; Rosa montana f. longepedunculata De la Soie ex Christ; Rosa montana var. longipedunculata (De la Soie ex Christ) R.Keller; Rosa montana f. sembrancheriana De la Soie ex Christ; Rosa montana f. wolfii (De la Soie ex Déségl.) R.Keller; Rosa sembrancheriana (De la Soie ex Christ) Crép.; Rosa wolfii De la Soie ex Déségl.

Species of flowering plant

Rosa chavinii is a species of flowering plant in the family Rosaceae. It belongs to the genus Rosa and grows as a deciduous shrub in temperate environments. The species is native to France, Switzerland, and Italy, although it is not known to occur in Sicily.

Rosa chavinii was first published in Catalogue des Plantes Vasculaires de Genève, edition 2:69 (1861) by Rapin ex Reuter. Rosa chavinii has 36 accepted synonyms. The species has three recorded vernacular names: Chavins Rose in German, Rosa di Chavin in Italian, and Rosier de Chavin in French.
