= Rosa brotherorum =

Scientific classification
- Kingdom: Plantae
- Clade: Embryophytes
- Clade: Tracheophytes
- Clade: Spermatophytes
- Clade: Angiosperms
- Clade: Eudicots
- Clade: Rosids
- Order: Rosales
- Family: Rosaceae
- Genus: Rosa
- Species: R. brotherorum

Binomial name
- Rosa brotherorum Chrshan.

Species of flowering plant

Rosa brotherorum is a species of flowering plant in the family Rosaceae. It belongs to the genus Rosa and grows as a shrub in temperate environments. The species is native to the regions of Transcaucasia and Ciscaucasia. It was first published in Botaničeskie Materialy Gerbariya Botanicheskogo Instituta Komarova Akademii Nauk S.S.S.R. 15:112 (1953).

== Distribution ==
While it is native to the Caucasus, Rosa brotherorum has been recorded at high elevations in mountainous regions, often above 4,000 m (13,000 ft). It has been encountered on several major peaks, including Mount Elbrus (5,642 m), Dykh-Tau (5,205 m), and Shkhara (5,193 m), among others.
