= Rosa alexeenkoi =

Scientific classification
- Kingdom: Plantae
- Clade: Embryophytes
- Clade: Tracheophytes
- Clade: Spermatophytes
- Clade: Angiosperms
- Clade: Eudicots
- Clade: Rosids
- Order: Rosales
- Family: Rosaceae
- Genus: Rosa
- Species: R. alexeenkoi

Binomial name
- Rosa alexeenkoi Crép. ex Juz.

Species of flowering plant

Rosa alexeenkoi is a species of flowering plant in the family Rosaceae. It is native to the Transcaucasus.

== Distribution ==
Rosa alexeenkoi is native to the Caucasus region of Azerbaijan and Russia.

== Habitat ==
Rosa alexeenkoi is a perennial shrub that grows in full sun and in moderately acid to slightly alkaline soils.
