= Rosa banksiopsis =

Scientific classification
- Kingdom: Plantae
- Clade: Embryophytes
- Clade: Tracheophytes
- Clade: Spermatophytes
- Clade: Angiosperms
- Clade: Eudicots
- Clade: Rosids
- Order: Rosales
- Family: Rosaceae
- Genus: Rosa
- Species: R. banksiopsis

Binomial name
- Rosa banksiopsis Baker

Species of flowering plant

Rosa banksiopsis is a species of flowering plant in the family Rosaceae. It belongs to the genus Rosa.

It is native to China, particularly North-Central China, South-Central China, and Southeast China. It is a shrub that grows in temperate biomes.

== Description ==
This plant has brown, branched stems with paired or scattered prickles that are straight or slightly spreading. The leaves are made of 7–9 oblong, pointed leaflets with simple serrations and smooth surfaces. Stipules are attached to the stem with small free ovate tips. Flowers are grouped in umbels on long smooth stalks. Sepals are elongated with leafy tips, while petals are red, smaller than the sepals, and obovate in shape. The styles remain inside the flower. The fruit is small, round, and red, with persistent upright sepals.

== Habitat ==
it grows in thickets at elevations of about 1,300–1,600 m (4,300–5,200 ft).
