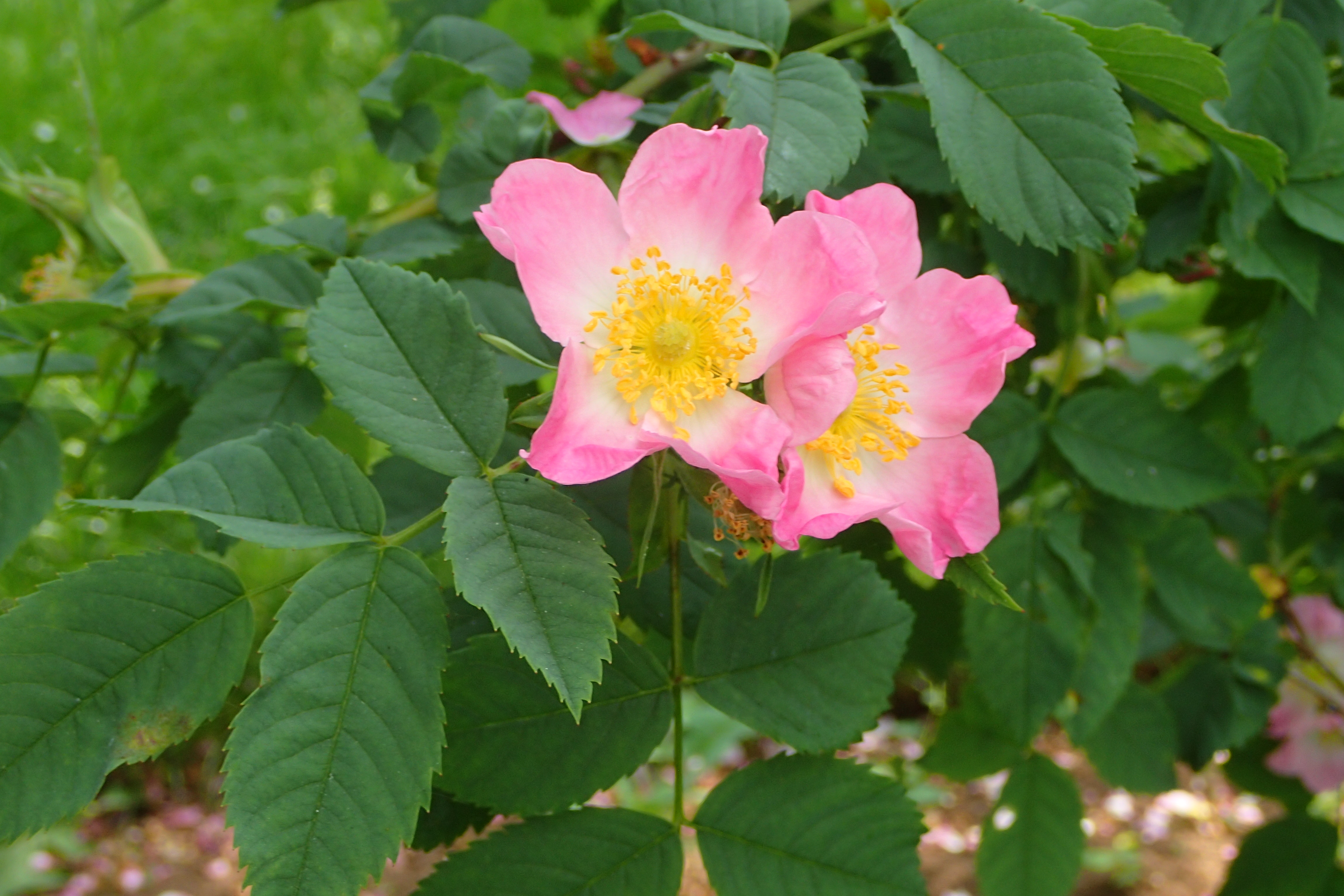
- Rosa dumalis, a formulation of Rosa x alpestris

Scientific classification
- Kingdom: Plantae
- Clade: Tracheophytes
- Clade: Angiosperms
- Clade: Eudicots
- Clade: Rosids
- Order: Rosales
- Family: Rosaceae
- Genus: Rosa
- Species: R. × alpestris

Binomial name
- Rosa × alpestris Rapin ex Reut., 1861

= Rosa × alpestris =

Hybrid species of plant

Rosa × alpestris is a hybrid species of flowering plant in the rose family. Its native range is Western Europe (including the United Kingdom and France) and Hungary. It is a shrub that grows primarily in temperate biomes. The hybrid formula is Rosa dumalis × Rosa sherardii. Rosa × alpestris was first scientifically described in 1861 in the botanical work Catalogus Plantarum Vascularium Genevensium, in Geneva, Switzerland.
