= Rosa altidaghestanica =

Scientific classification
- Kingdom: Plantae
- Clade: Embryophytes
- Clade: Tracheophytes
- Clade: Spermatophytes
- Clade: Angiosperms
- Clade: Eudicots
- Clade: Rosids
- Order: Rosales
- Family: Rosaceae
- Genus: Rosa
- Species: R. altidaghestanica

Binomial name
- Rosa altidaghestanica Husseinov

Species of flowering plant

Rosa altidaghestanica is a species of flowering plant in the family Rosaceae. It is native to the northeastern Caucasus, where it grows in temperate regions, typically in mountainous habitats. The species is a shrubby rose adapted to rocky slopes and upland environments.

The species was first formally described in 1989 by the botanist Husseinov.
