= Rosa chengkouensis =

Scientific classification
- Kingdom: Plantae
- Clade: Embryophytes
- Clade: Tracheophytes
- Clade: Spermatophytes
- Clade: Angiosperms
- Clade: Eudicots
- Clade: Rosids
- Order: Rosales
- Family: Rosaceae
- Genus: Rosa
- Species: R. chengkouensis

Binomial name
- Rosa chengkouensis T.T.Yu & T.C.Ku

Species of flowering plant

Rosa chengkouensis is a shrub and grows in temperate environments. The species is native to Chongqing, China.

It is a species of flowering plant in the genus Rosa and family Rosaceae. It was first published in Bulletin of Botanical Research, Harbin 1(4):9 (1981) by the botanists Yu Te-Tsun and Ku Tsue-Chih. The species has one recorded vernacular name, 城口薔薇 (cheng kou qiang wei), which translates to "Chengkou rose" in English. The name refers to Chengkou County, the area from which the species was originally described.
