= Rosa abrica =

Scientific classification
- Kingdom: Plantae
- Clade: Tracheophytes
- Clade: Angiosperms
- Clade: Eudicots
- Clade: Rosids
- Order: Rosales
- Family: Rosaceae
- Genus: Rosa
- Species: R. abrica

Binomial name
- Rosa abrica Khat. & Koobaz (2011)

Species of rose native to Iran

Rosa abrica is a species of rose in the plant family Rosaceae, native to Iran.

Rosa abrica is described as being largely similar to Rosa foetida but different in several significant traits such as the number of leaflets, corymb inflorescence, form of hairs and other characteristics.

Rosa abrica is a shrub with spreading flexible branches growing up to a height of 1.5-2 m. It has 5-7 leaves that are green on both sides, elliptic or obovate and hairy on the undersides. It has yellow multi-petalled flowers that can be in corymbs or solitary.
