= Rosa × bigeneris =

Scientific classification
- Kingdom: Plantae
- Clade: Tracheophytes
- Clade: Angiosperms
- Clade: Eudicots
- Clade: Rosids
- Order: Rosales
- Family: Rosaceae
- Genus: Rosa
- Species: R. × bigeneris

Binomial name
- Rosa × bigeneris Duffort ex Rouy

Species of flowering plant

Rosa × bigeneris is a hybrid species in the Rosaceae family. The formula of this hybrid is R. micrantha × R. rubiginosa. It is a shrub and primarily grows in temperate environments. It is native to France, Germany, Great Britain, Hungary, Ireland, and Ukraine. It was first published in G. Rouy & J. Foucaud, Fl. France 6: 377 (1900).

== Taxonomy ==
Rosa × bigeneris has a complex taxonomic history where botanists named it under different names, and it has 7 accepted synonyms.
