= Rosa zaramagensis =

Scientific classification
- Kingdom: Plantae
- Clade: Tracheophytes
- Clade: Angiosperms
- Clade: Eudicots
- Clade: Rosids
- Order: Rosales
- Family: Rosaceae
- Genus: Rosa
- Species: R. zaramagensis

Binomial name
- Rosa zaramagensis Demurova

Species of rose

Rosa zaramagensis is a species of rose. Rosa zaramagensis is part of the genus Rosa, and the family Rosaceae Native to: North Caucasus, Transcaucasus.
