= Rosa amblyophylla =

Scientific classification
- Kingdom: Plantae
- Clade: Embryophytes
- Clade: Tracheophytes
- Clade: Spermatophytes
- Clade: Angiosperms
- Clade: Eudicots
- Clade: Rosids
- Order: Rosales
- Family: Rosaceae
- Genus: Rosa
- Species: R. amblyophylla

Binomial name
- Rosa amblyophylla Kult.

Species of flowering plant

Rosa amblyophylla is a wild rose native to Central Asia, particularly Turkmenistan. It is a shrub adapted to temperate environments. The species was discovered by Mikhail Vasilyevich Kultiasov and first published in Index Seminum, issued by the Academy of Sciences of the USSR, in 1946.
