= Rosa abutalybovii =

Scientific classification
- Kingdom: Plantae
- Clade: Tracheophytes
- Clade: Angiosperms
- Clade: Eudicots
- Clade: Rosids
- Order: Rosales
- Family: Rosaceae
- Genus: Rosa
- Species: R. abutalybovii

Binomial name
- Rosa abutalybovii Gadzh.

Species of rose native to the South Caucasus

Rosa abutalybovii, commonly known as Abutalybov's brier, is a species of rose native to the South Caucasus.
