= Rosa × hibernica =

Scientific classification
- Kingdom: Plantae
- Clade: Embryophytes
- Clade: Tracheophytes
- Clade: Spermatophytes
- Clade: Angiosperms
- Clade: Eudicots
- Clade: Rosids
- Order: Rosales
- Family: Rosaceae
- Genus: Rosa
- Species: R. × hibernica

Binomial name
- Rosa × hibernica Templeton

Hybrid species of flowering plant

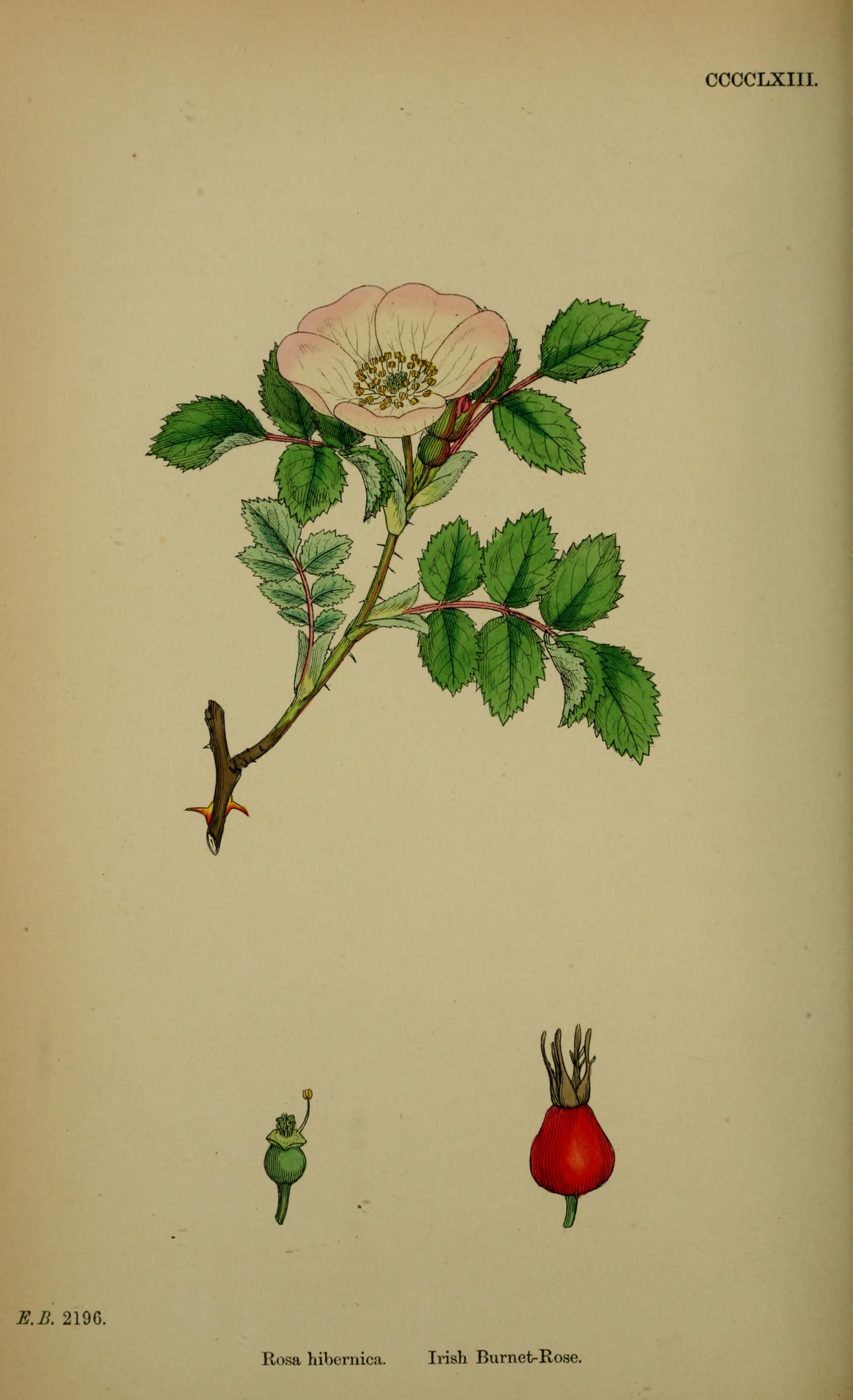
Flower and fruit of the hybrid

Rosa × hibernica is a hybrid species of flowering plant belonging to the Rosaceae family, and is placed in the genus Rosa. This rose is a cross between two parent species: Rosa corymbifera and Rosa spinosissima. This means it is a naturally occurring hybrid requiring both parent species for its origin.

The hybrid is a deciduous shrub adapted to temperate biomes.

It is native to parts of the British Isles (United Kingdom and Ireland) and also reported from the Caucasus region. It was first published in Transactions of the Royal Dublin Society.

== Taxonomy ==
Since its original description, it has been treated under multiple names by different botanists, resulting in about 13 recognized synonyms, often reflecting regional interpretations or morphological variation within the hybrid complex.
