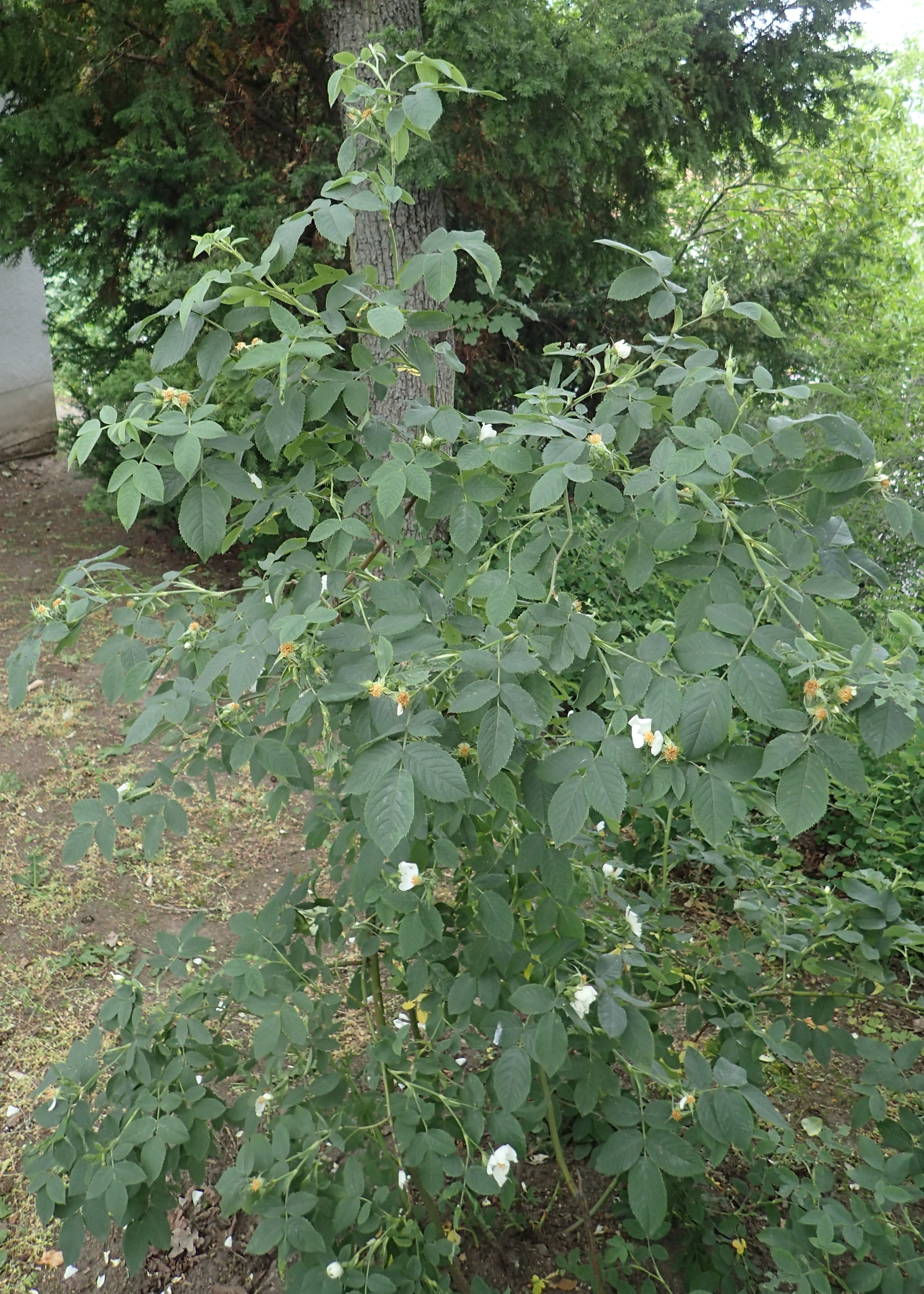
- R. achburensis being grown in Germany

Scientific classification
- Kingdom: Plantae
- Clade: Tracheophytes
- Clade: Angiosperms
- Clade: Eudicots
- Clade: Rosids
- Order: Rosales
- Family: Rosaceae
- Genus: Rosa
- Species: R. achburensis

Binomial name
- Rosa achburensis Chrshan.

= Rosa achburensis =

Species of rose native to Kyrgyzstan and Tajikistan

Rosa achburensis is a species of rose native to Kyrgyzstan and Tajikistan. The taxon was first published by Vladimir Gennadievich Chrshanovski in 1952.
