= Rosa donetzica =

Scientific classification
- Kingdom: Plantae
- Clade: Embryophytes
- Clade: Tracheophytes
- Clade: Spermatophytes
- Clade: Angiosperms
- Clade: Eudicots
- Clade: Rosids
- Order: Rosales
- Family: Rosaceae
- Genus: Rosa
- Species: R. donetzica

Binomial name
- Rosa donetzica Dubovik

Species of flowering plant

Rosa donetzica is a species of rose in the family Rosaceae, native to Ukraine and south European Russia, generally near the eastern Black Sea. It is a rare endemic typically found growing in rocky areas, and is decreasing in abundance due to pressure from grazing and stone quarrying.
