= Rosa alberti =

Scientific classification
- Kingdom: Plantae
- Clade: Tracheophytes
- Clade: Angiosperms
- Clade: Eudicots
- Clade: Rosids
- Order: Rosales
- Family: Rosaceae
- Genus: Rosa
- Species: R. alberti

Binomial name
- Rosa alberti Regel

Species of rose

Rosa alberti is a species of flowering plant in the family Rosaceae. It is native to Central Asia.

== Distribution ==
Rosa alberti is native to Central Asia, Siberia and parts of China.

== Classification ==
Rosa alberti is classified as a member of the genus Rosa in the family Rosaceae.

== Habitat ==
Rosa alberti grows in areas with slightly acidic to slightly alkaline soils and lives in the same conditions as many other members of the rose genus.
