= Rosa × binaloudensis =

Scientific classification
- Kingdom: Plantae
- Clade: Tracheophytes
- Clade: Angiosperms
- Clade: Eudicots
- Clade: Rosids
- Order: Rosales
- Family: Rosaceae
- Genus: Rosa
- Species: R. × binaloudensis

Binomial name
- Rosa × binaloudensis Vaezi, Arjmandi & Sharghi

Hybrid species of flowering plant

Rosa × binaloudensis is a hybrid species in the family Rosaceae and belongs to the genus Rosa. It is a natural hybrid between Rosa beggeriana and Rosa persica (R. beggeriana × R. persica). The species is native to Iran, where it grows as a shrub in temperate habitats. It was first formally described and published in Phytotaxa 411: 33 in 2019. As a species only recently recognized and described by science, it represents a relatively recent addition to the known diversity of the genus Rosa.
