= Rosa biebersteiniana =

Scientific classification
- Kingdom: Plantae
- Clade: Embryophytes
- Clade: Tracheophytes
- Clade: Spermatophytes
- Clade: Angiosperms
- Clade: Eudicots
- Clade: Rosids
- Order: Rosales
- Family: Rosaceae
- Genus: Rosa
- Species: R. biebersteiniana

Binomial name
- Rosa biebersteiniana Trattinnick

Species of flowering plant

Rosa biebersteiniana is a species of flowering plant in the rose family, Rosaceae. It belongs to the genus Rosa and grows as a shrub in temperate regions. The species is native to the Transcaucasia. It was first described and published by Leopold Trattinnick in Rosacearum Monographia 2: 5 (1823).

== Taxonomy ==
Rosa biebersteiniana has a relatively complex taxonomic history. Over time, various botanists treated the species under different names or ranks, often regarding it as a distinct species or as a variety of another taxon. As a result, the species has accumulated several nomenclatural synonyms and currently has four accepted homotypic synonyms.
