= Rosa calcarea =

Scientific classification
- Kingdom: Plantae
- Clade: Embryophytes
- Clade: Tracheophytes
- Clade: Spermatophytes
- Clade: Angiosperms
- Clade: Eudicots
- Clade: Rosids
- Order: Rosales
- Family: Rosaceae
- Genus: Rosa
- Species: R. calcarea

Binomial name
- Rosa calcarea Lipsch. & Sumnev.

Species of flowering plant

Rosa calcarea is a species of flowering plant in the family Rosaceae. It belongs to the genus Rosa and grows as a deciduous shrub in temperate environments. The species is native to Central Asia, specifically Kazakhstan. The name Rosa calcarea was first published in Byulleten' Moskovskogo Obshchestva Ispytatelei Prirody, Otdel Biologicheskii, new series, 52(4):85 (1947).

== Flowering period ==
This species blooms from August to September, producing its flowers late in the growing season. The flowering period is relatively short and typically occurs during late summer to early autumn, depending on local climatic conditions within its native range.
