= Rosa × caviniacensis =

Scientific classification
- Kingdom: Plantae
- Clade: Tracheophytes
- Clade: Angiosperms
- Clade: Eudicots
- Clade: Rosids
- Order: Rosales
- Family: Rosaceae
- Genus: Rosa
- Species: R. × caviniacensis

Binomial name
- Rosa × caviniacensis Ozanon

Synonyms
- Rosa pimpinellifolia subsp. caviniacensis (Ozanon) Malag.; Rosa pimpinellifolia var. caviniacensis (Ozanon) Malag.; Rosa × cavinianensis Ozanon

Species of flowering plant

Rosa × caviniacensis is a hybrid species of flowering plant in the family Rosaceae. It belongs to the genus Rosa and grows as a shrub in temperate environments. The hybrid is native to Spain and France.

Rosa × caviniacensis was first published in C. Magnier, Scrinia Florae Selectae 11:246 (1892) by the botanist Ozanon. This species has three accepted synonyms. These include one name published at the subspecies rank, one at the variety rank, and another published under a different varietal name.
