= Rosa beauvaisii =

Scientific classification
- Kingdom: Plantae
- Clade: Embryophytes
- Clade: Tracheophytes
- Clade: Spermatophytes
- Clade: Angiosperms
- Clade: Eudicots
- Clade: Rosids
- Order: Rosales
- Family: Rosaceae
- Genus: Rosa
- Species: R. beauvaisii

Binomial name
- Rosa beauvaisii Cardot

Species of flowering plant

Rosa beauvaisii is a species of flowering plant in the family Rosaceae. It belongs to the genus Rosa.

This species is native to Vietnam, where it grows as a shrub. It is one of the few rose species adapted to subtropical environments, occurring in regions with warm, humid climates

It was first published in Notulae Systematicae by the French botanist Jules Cardot.
