= List of Rosa species of the Balkans =

This article lists the 30 or so species in the genus Rosa (roses or briars) that are native to the Balkans.

For the purpose of this list, the northern boundary of the Balkans is taken to be the straight line from Trieste to the Danube Delta. European Turkey is included, and so are the islands in the west of the Aegean Sea (including Crete), but the eastern Aegean islands fall outside the boundaries of this region.

The list is confined to native species: indigenous species that grow in the wild. This excludes any that may be used in cultivation, such as the many varieties of ornamental garden roses or the ones grown commercially for their rose oil in Bulgaria's Rose Valley.

== List of species ==
This list follows the order used in Atlas Florae Europaeae, where closely related species appear closer together. Each entry briefly outlines the parts of the Balkan Peninsula where each species is found, and then briefly gives the general distribution. Some synonyms, if previously commonly treated as distinct species in the literature, are also listed.

- Rosa sempervirens L. – Much of Greece and the Adriatic coast, Crete, and a small area near Istanbul; the Mediterranean region of Europe and north-western Africa.
- Rosa arvensis Huds. – much of the western half of the peninsula and in northern Greece, also in places in Bulgaria and southern Greece; Southern, Central, and Western Europe.
- Rosa spinosissima L. – mostly in the mountainous areas of the peninsula (except western Albania and central/southern Greece); western and central Europe, the Caucasus and Central Asia.
- Rosa glauca Pourret – the mountains in the West of the peninsula and Bulgaria (Rila, Pirin, Sredna Gora and Stara Planina); from the Pyrenees, through the mountains of Central Europe and up to Ukraine and southwest Asia.
- Rosa pendulina L. – found in the higher mountains throughout the peninsula (at elevations of 1000–2500 in Bulgaria); central and southern Europe.
- Rosa gallica L. – throughout the peninsula (excluding southern Greece); central and southeastern Europe, Anatolia, and the Caucasus. This includes Rosa pumila Jacq., which in some previous works was treated as a separate species.
- Rosa marginata Wallr. ( = Rosa jundzillii Besser) – in a few areas in Bosnia and Herzegovina, northeastern Serbia, southern Romania, northern Greece, parts of Bulgaria (in the Rhodopes and in the north of the country).
- Rosa montana Chaix - Pindus mountains; the Pyrenees, the Alps, and the mountains of Italy.
- Rosa canina L. – widespread throughout the peninsula; Europe, north-western Africa, western Asia.
- Rosa corymbifera Borkh. – Bosnia and Herzegovina, Montenegro, North Macedonia, Bulgaria, Romania; scattered areas in Serbia, Croatia, European Turkey, and Greece (including Crete); throughout Europe. Rosa obtusifolia Desv. is here assumed to be a synonym, though in the Bulgarian literature this has been listed as a separate species; some instances of R. obtusifolia have, however, been referred to R. balsamica Besser.
- Rosa dumalis Bechst. – western Balkans, wider Macedonia region, Romania, Bulgaria, small scattered areas of Greece (and possibly Crete); Europe, the Caucasus, western Asia. Rosa vosagiaca Des. is a synonym.
- Rosa subcanina (Christ.) Vuk. – Croatia, Romanian Dobrudzha, possibly Bulgaria; central and northern Europe. It is tentatively treated as an independent species, though many see it as a hybrid or include it within R. dumalis.
- Rosa caesia Sm. – scattered areas in Romania and Bulgaria; central and northern Europe.
- Rosa subcollina (Christ.) Vuk. - scattered areas of the Western Balkans, probably also Bulgaria; northern and central Europe, the mountains of southern Europe. It is here tentatively treated as an independent species; many have seen it as a hybrid or have included it within either R. caesia, or R. dumalis or R. corymbifera.
- Rosa balsamica Besser – Romania, scattered places in the Western Balkans, uncertain in Greece; Europe and the Caucasus.
- Rosa abietina Gren. ex Christ – the Istria peninsula in Croatia; the Alps.
- Rosa tomentosa Sm. – throughout the Balkans except all but the northernmost parts of Greece; Europe, Anatolia and the Caucasus.
- Rosa villosa L. – western Balkans, southwestern Romania, western Bulgaria, northern Greece; central, southern and eastern Europe.
- Rosa mollis Sm. – a few scattered areas in Croatia, Bosnia and Herzegovina, Serbia, Montenegro, and western Bulgaria The species is otherwise widespread in northern Europe and it has been hypothesised that the reports of its occurrence in the rest of the continent (including on the Balkans) may in fact stem from confusion with either R. villosa or R. sherardii.
- Rosa heckeliana Tratt. – Greece (including Crete), Albania, Northern Macedonia, Bulgaria (the Pirin and Slavyanka mountains in the south-west) and in a single area in Croatia; also present in southern Italy.
- Rosa rubiginosa L. – areas in Croatia, Bosnia and Herzegovina, Serbia, Romania and possibly Bulgaria. Europe (except the north/north-east) and the Caucasus.
- Rosa elliptica Tausch = Rosa inodora Fries s. lato. In the 2004 Atlas Florae Europaeae, R. elliptica is subsumed under R. inodora, although some sources, like World Flora Online, take R. inodora in a narrower sense, in which case the two are not treated as synonyms. Others have seen R. inodora as simply a hybrid between R. elliptica and R. agrestis. The species is native to Central Europe, and on the Balkans it is found in scattered areas in Croatia, northern Serbia, Romania, and – according to the Bulgarian literature – also in some of the mountains of western and southern Bulgaria.
- Rosa agrestis Savi – throughout the peninsula; Europe, north-west Africa and south-west Asia.
- Rosa micrantha Borrer ex Sm. – from Croatia to Macedonia, parts of Serbia, Romania, Bulgaria and European Turkey; western, southern and central Europe, Crimea, Turkey, north-western Africa, Caucasia.
- Rosa caryophyllacea Besser – Croatia, northern Serbia, southwestern Romania, and Bulgaria (the sea coast and the north-west); central and south-eastern Europe and the Caucasus.
- Rosa pulverulenta M. Bieb. (incl. Rosa glutinosa Sibth. et Sm. and Rosa sicula Tratt.) – the southern half of the Balkan peninsula: from Bosnia and Bulgaria to Crete; the Mediterranean (including northwest Africa and northwest Asia).
- Rosa iberica Steven – European Turkey; from Turkey and the Caucasus to Iran and Turkmenistan.
- Rosa turcica Rouy – Romanian Dobrudzha, parts of Bulgaria, Macedonia, northern Greece, European Turkey; Ukraine, Anatolia, the Caucasus.

The reports of Rosa pouzinii Tratt. for Greece, and of Rosa oxyodon Boiss. for Bulgaria are likely erroneous. Six endemic species described by Stojan Dimitrov in the 1960s for Bulgaria have subsequently been rejected as independent species. These are Rosa parilica, which was reduced to a synonym of R. heckeliana Tratt.; Rosa pontica, later shown to represent misidentified individuals of R. turcica Rouy; Rosa orphei, which was identified as the hybrid R. pendulina × R. dumalis; Rosa bulgarica and Rosa rhodopaea, both likely representing varieties of R. pulverulenta; and Rosa balcanica, whose herbarium specimens are a mixture of the hybrids R. pendulina × R. villosa L., R. pendulina × R. canina L. and R. pendulina × R. dumalis Bechst.

== Bibliography ==
- Asyov, B.; Petrova, A.; Dimitrov, D.; Vassilev, R. (2012). Conspectus of the Bulgarian Vascular Flora : Distribution Maps and Floristic Elements (4 ed.). Sofia: Bulgarian Biodiversity Foundation. Archived from the original on 2021-10-11.
- Bakker, Piet; Maes, Bert; Maskew, Roger; Stace, Clive (2019). "Dog-roses (Rosa sect. Caninae): towards a consensus taxonomy". British & Irish Botany. 1 (1): 7–19. doi:10.33928/bib.2019.01.007. ISSN 2632-4970. S2CID 134016249.
- Dimitrov, Stojan G. (1966). "Novi vidove šipki (Rosa L.) ot florata na Bǎlgarija". Naučni trudove - Visš selskostopanski institut "Vasil Kolarov" – Plovdiv. 15 (1). Hristo G. Danov: 49–61.
- Dimitrov, Stojan (1973). "Shipka – Rosa L.". In Vǎlev, Stoju; Asenov, Ivan (eds.). Flora na Narodna Republika Bǎlgarija (in Bulgarian). Vol. V. Sofia: Bulgarian Academy of Sciences.
- Kurtto, Arto; Lampinen, Raino; Junikka, Leo (2004). Atlas florae Europaeae, distribution of vascular plants in Europe. 13: Rosaceae (Spiraea to Fragaria, excl. Rubus). Helsinki: Committee for mapping the flora of Europe and Societas Biologica Fennica. ISBN 978-951-9108-14-8.
- Meusel, Hermann; Jäger, E.; Weinert, E. (1965). Vergleichende Chorologie der zentraleuropäischen Flora. Vol. [Band I]. Jena: Fischer.
- Zieliński, Jerzy; Petrova, Ana; Tan, Kit (2004). "Taxonomic status of the roses (Rosa) described by S.G. Dimitrov from Bulgaria". Annales Botanici Fennici. 41 (6): 449–451. ISSN 0003-3847. JSTOR 23727258.
