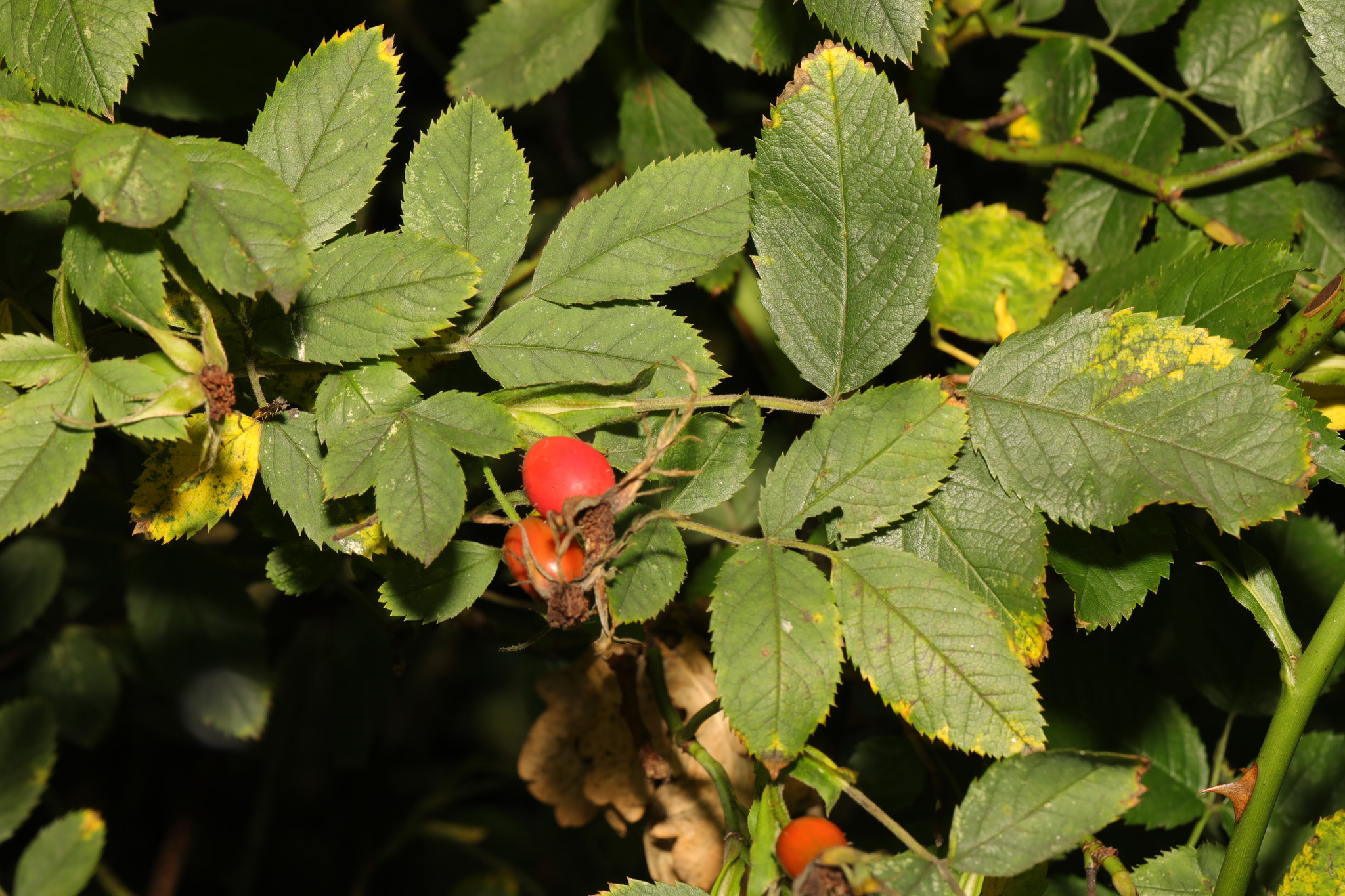
- Leaves and hips

Scientific classification
- Kingdom: Plantae
- Clade: Tracheophytes
- Clade: Angiosperms
- Clade: Eudicots
- Clade: Rosids
- Order: Rosales
- Family: Rosaceae
- Genus: Rosa
- Species: R. deseglisei

Binomial name
- Rosa deseglisei Boreau

Synonyms
- List: Crepinia deseglisei (Boreau) Gand.; Rosa canina f. deseglisei (Boreau) Crép.; Rosa canina var. deseglisei (Boreau) Malinv.; Rosa canina var. segobricensis (Pau ex C.Vicioso) C.Vicioso; Rosa canina var. urticifolia Cuatrec.; Rosa communis var. deseglisei (Boreau) Rouy & E.G.Camus; Rosa corymbifera subsp. deseglisei (Boreau) Stohr; Rosa deseglisei var. adampolensis J.B.Keller & Formánek; Rosa deseglisei f. sarmatica (Heinr.Braun) Hayek; Rosa obnubila subsp. segobricensis Pau ex Almq.; Rosa pouzinii var. segobricensis Pau ex C.Vicioso; Rosa sarmatica Heinr.Braun; Rosa segobricensis Pau; Rosa × collina var. deseglisei (Boreau) Dumort.; Rosa × dumetorum var. deseglisei (Boreau) R.Keller; Rosa × dumetorum f. deseglisei (Boreau) Christ; Rosa × dumetorum subsp. deseglisei (Boreau) Stoj. & Stef.

= Rosa deseglisei =

Species of plant

Rosa deseglisei is a species of flowering plant in the family Rosaceae, native to Europe, northwestern Africa, and Iraq. Most authorities consider it to be a subspecies or variety of Rosa corymbifera or Rosa canina.
