= Rosa × bishopii =

Scientific classification
- Kingdom: Plantae
- Clade: Tracheophytes
- Clade: Angiosperms
- Clade: Eudicots
- Clade: Rosids
- Order: Rosales
- Family: Rosaceae
- Genus: Rosa
- Species: R. × bishopii

Binomial name
- Rosa × bishopii Wolley-Dod

Hybrid species of flowering plant

Rosa × bishopii is a hybrid species of rose in the family Rosaceae. It belongs to the genus Rosa and grows as a deciduous shrub in temperate environments. The hybrid is the result of a cross between Rosa agrestis and Rosa micrantha, giving it the formula R. agrestis × R. micrantha. It is native to Scotland and England, where it is typically found in hedgerows, scrubland, and along woodland edges. The name was first published in Revision of British Roses on page 99 in 1931. Like many wild roses, it is well adapted to the temperate climate of its native range.

== Taxonomy ==
Rosa × bishopii has had a somewhat unusual taxonomic history. The hybrid was generally recognized under the name Rosa × bishopii until 1992, when the botanist P. V. Heath reclassified it as Rosa eglanteria var. bishopii. This new combination was first published in Calyx 1: 174 in 1992.

== Distribution ==
Rosa × bishopii is native to Scotland and England. Although rare, it has also been encountered in Spain and France, where isolated populations or individual specimens have been recorded outside its native range.
