= Rosa × belnensis =

Scientific classification
- Kingdom: Plantae
- Clade: Tracheophytes
- Clade: Angiosperms
- Clade: Eudicots
- Clade: Rosids
- Order: Rosales
- Family: Rosaceae
- Genus: Rosa
- Species: R. × belnensis

Binomial name
- Rosa × belnensis Ozanon

Hybrid species of flowering plant

Rosa × belnensis is a hybrid rose in the family Rosaceae. It is a shrub that grows in temperate regions and is the result of a natural cross between Rosa agrestis and Rosa canina. The hybrid is native to the British Isles, Hungary, and the territories of the former Yugoslavia. It was first described by Paul Ozanon and published in Bulletin de la Société Dauphinoise pour l'Échange des Plantes 8: 326 in 1881. The hybrid formula is Rosa agrestis × Rosa canina. It is typically found in hedgerows, scrubland, and woodland margins within its native range.

== Taxonomy ==
This hybrid has a complex taxonomic history and has been described under several different scientific names by various botanists. Its synonymy includes three homotypic synonyms and three heterotypic synonyms.
