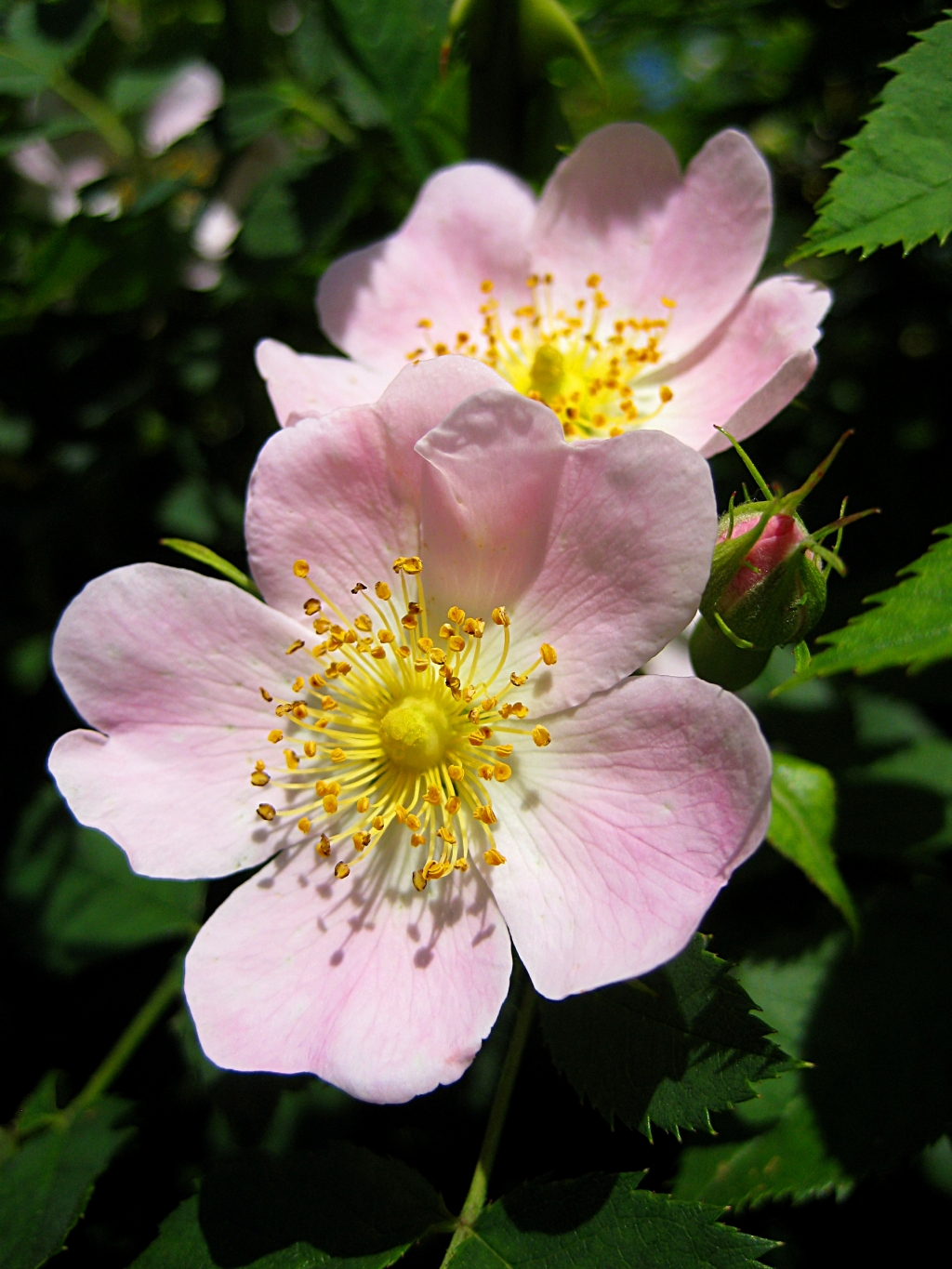

Scientific classification
- Kingdom: Plantae
- Clade: Tracheophytes
- Clade: Angiosperms
- Clade: Eudicots
- Clade: Rosids
- Order: Rosales
- Family: Rosaceae
- Genus: Rosa
- Subgenus: Rosa subg. Rosa
- Section: Rosa sect. Caninae
- Subsection: Rosa subsect. Caninae

= Rosa subsect. Caninae =

Subsection of plant

Rosa subsection Caninae is one of several subsections of the section Caninae in the genus Rosa. It includes Rosa canina, commonly known as the dog rose or briar rose.

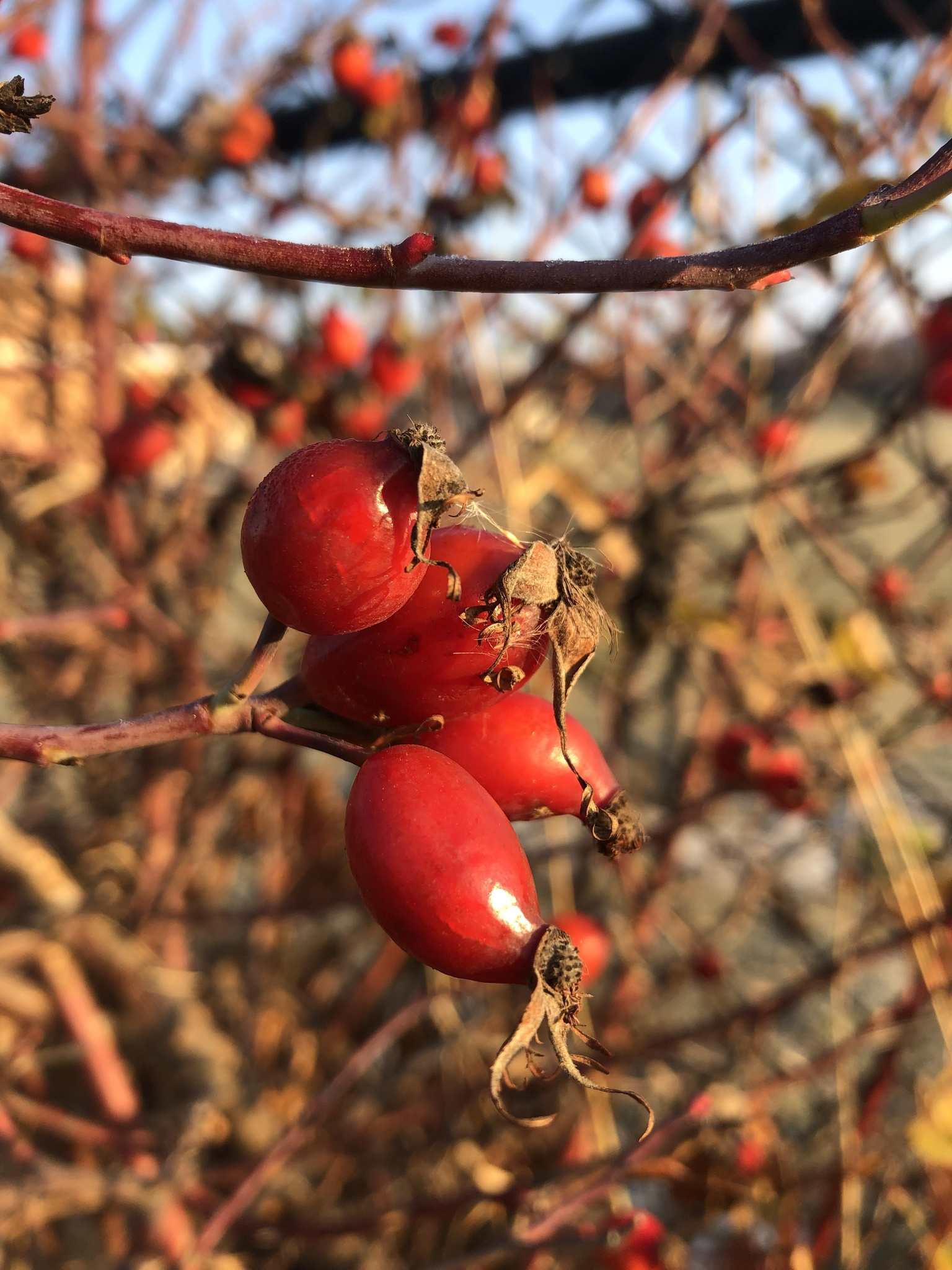
The rose-hips.

== See also ==
- Permanent odd polyploidy, an unusual form of meiosis found in this group.
