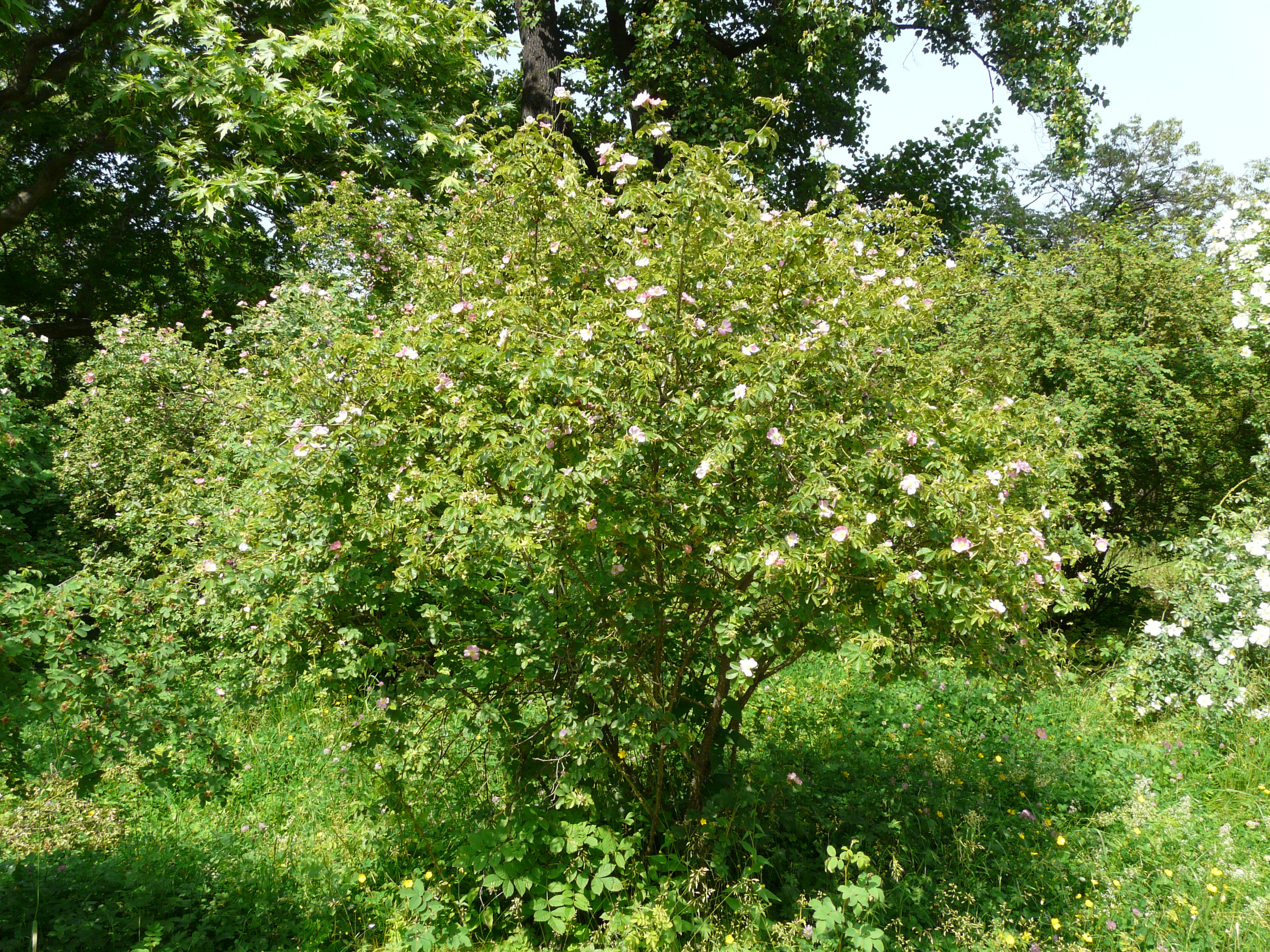
- In bloom

Scientific classification
- Kingdom: Plantae
- Clade: Embryophytes
- Clade: Tracheophytes
- Clade: Spermatophytes
- Clade: Angiosperms
- Clade: Eudicots
- Clade: Rosids
- Order: Rosales
- Family: Rosaceae
- Genus: Rosa
- Species: R. micrantha

Binomial name
- Rosa micrantha Borrer ex Sm.

Synonyms
- List: Rosa arcadiensis Halácsy; Rosa bordzilowskii Chrshan.; Rosa candida Davidov; Rosa canescens Borrer ex Sm.; Rosa chomutoviensis Chrshan. & Lasebna; Rosa diminuta Boreau ex Déségl.; Rosa eglanteria var. nemoralis (Léman) P.V.Heath; Rosa ferociformis (Prodan) Prodan; Rosa hirciana Heinr.Braun; Rosa histrix Léman; Rosa hungarica A.Kern.; Rosa lactiflora Déségl.; Rosa lantoscana Burnat & Gremli; Rosa lemanii Boreau; Rosa leucadia Heinr.Braun; Rosa libertiana Tratt.; Rosa lusseri Lagger & Puget; Rosa meridionalis Burnat & Gremli; Rosa mukatscheviensis Chrshan.; Rosa nemoralis Léman; Rosa oblongifolia Dum.Cours.; Rosa operta Puget ex Crép.; Rosa permixta Déségl.; Rosa perparva Borbás; Rosa psammophila Chrshan.; Rosa rubiginosa var. nemoralis (Léman) Thory; Rosa septicola Déségl.; Rosa septicoloides Crép.; Rosa sphaerophora Ripart ex Nyman; Rosa subspoliata Déségl. & Ozanon; Rosa trinacriae Burnat & Gremli

= Rosa micrantha =

Species of flowering plant

Rosa micrantha, the small-flowered sweet briar, is a species of flowering plant in the family Rosaceae. It is native to most of Europe, the Atlas Mountains of Africa, the Caucasus region, Turkey, Lebanon, and Syria, and it has been introduced to eastern North America, Argentina, and New Zealand. A shrub reaching 3.5 m (11 ft), it is not readily available in commerce.

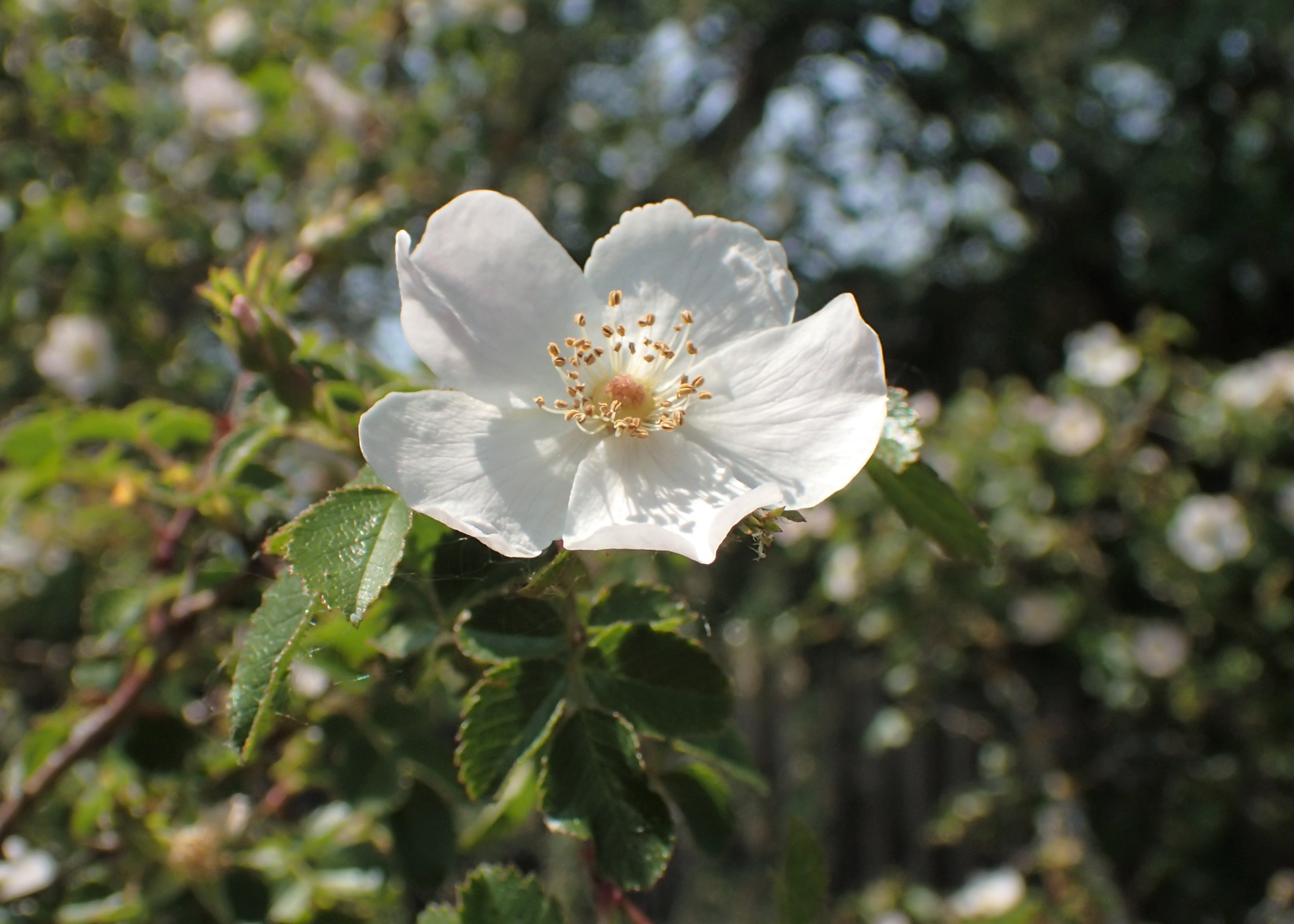
Close-up of flower

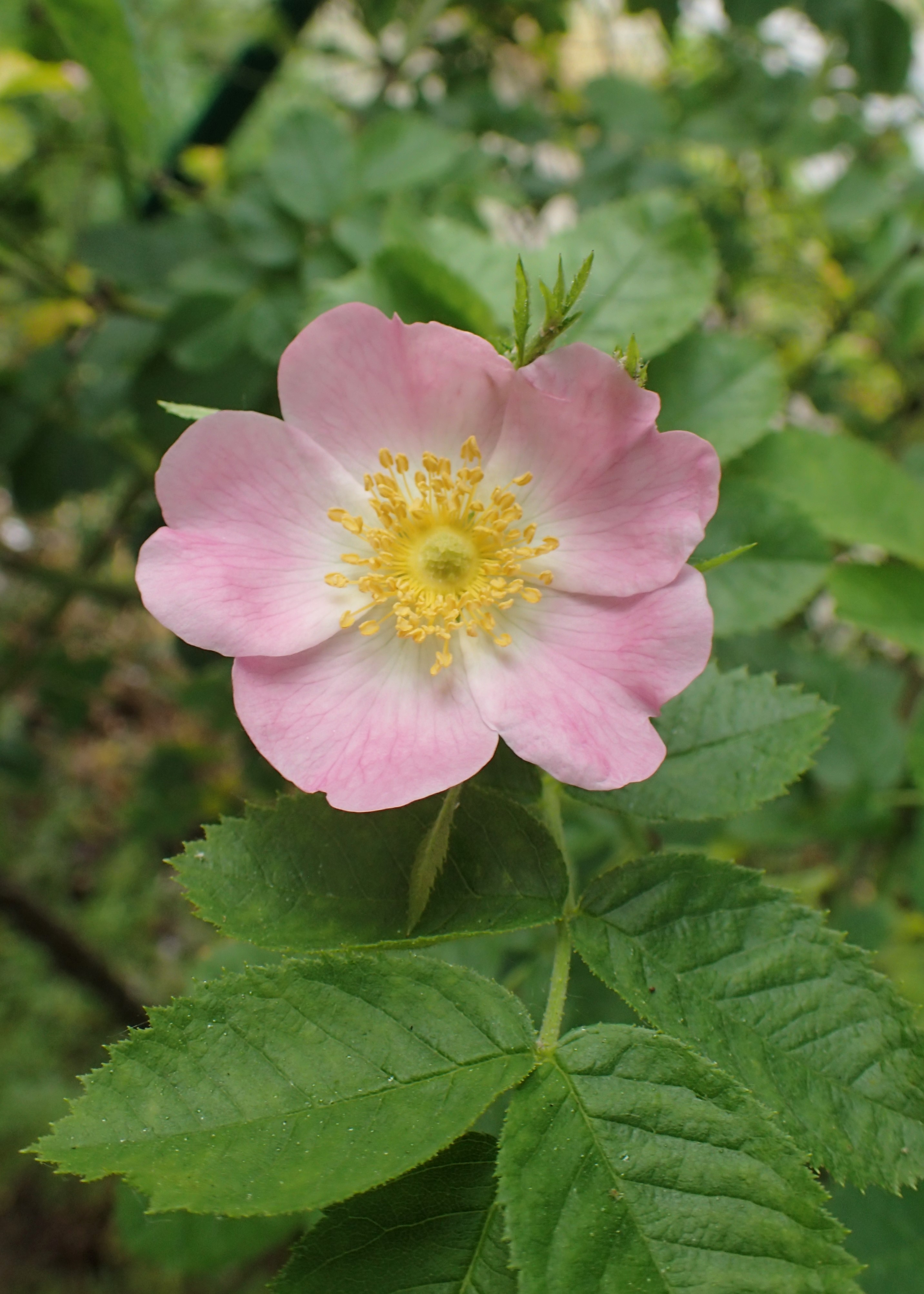
Flowers can be pink.

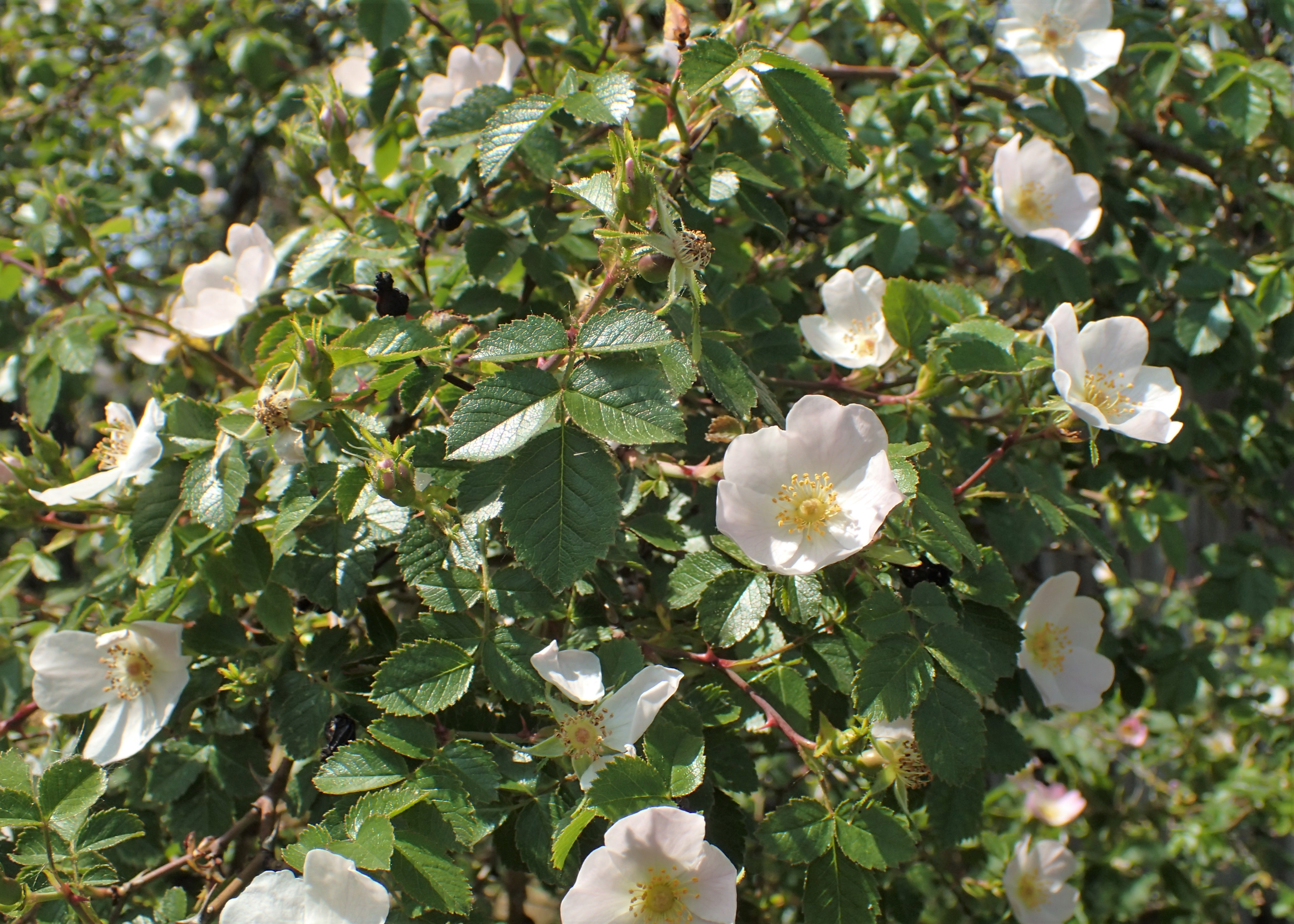
Flowers and foliage

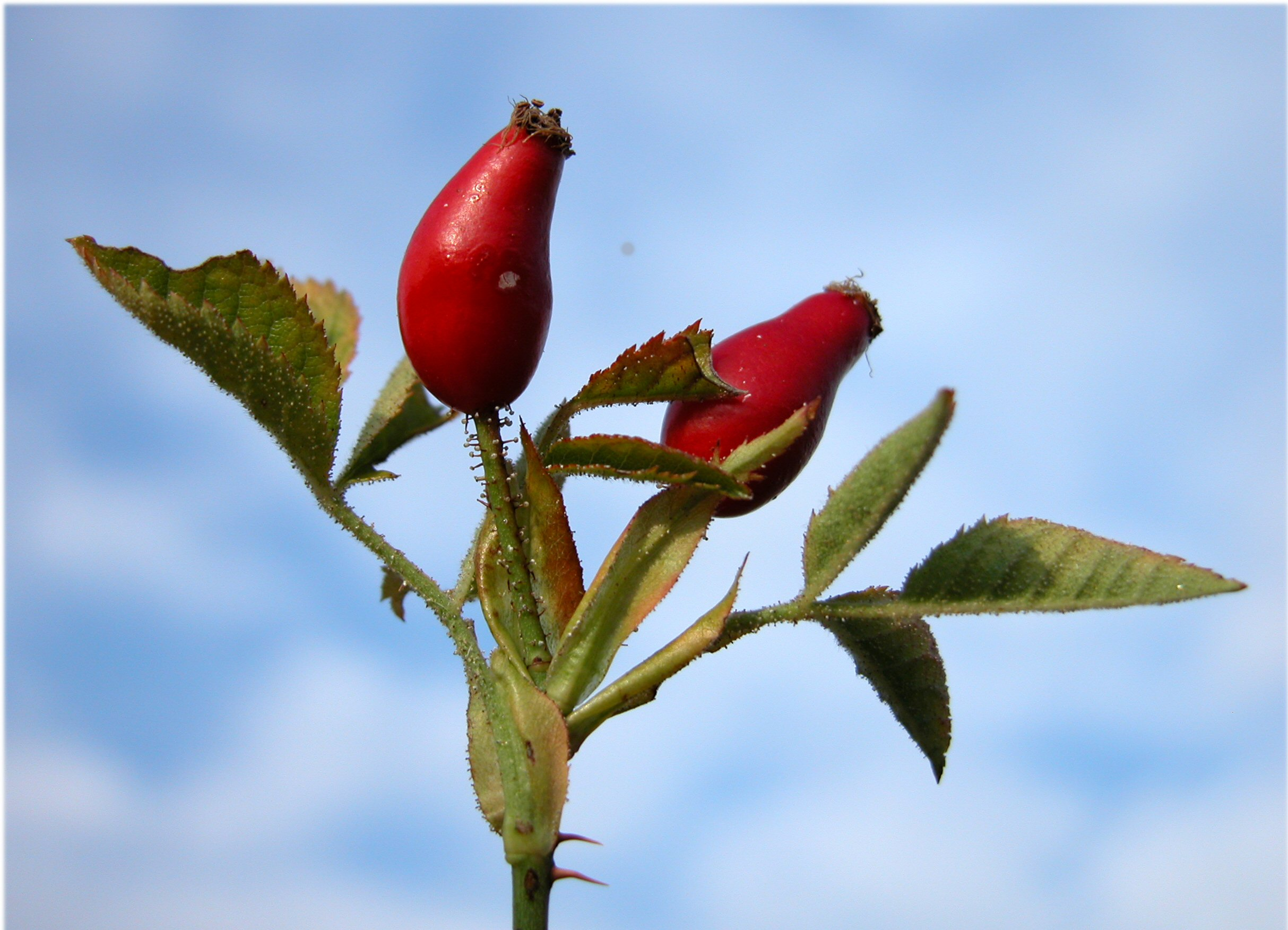
Hips

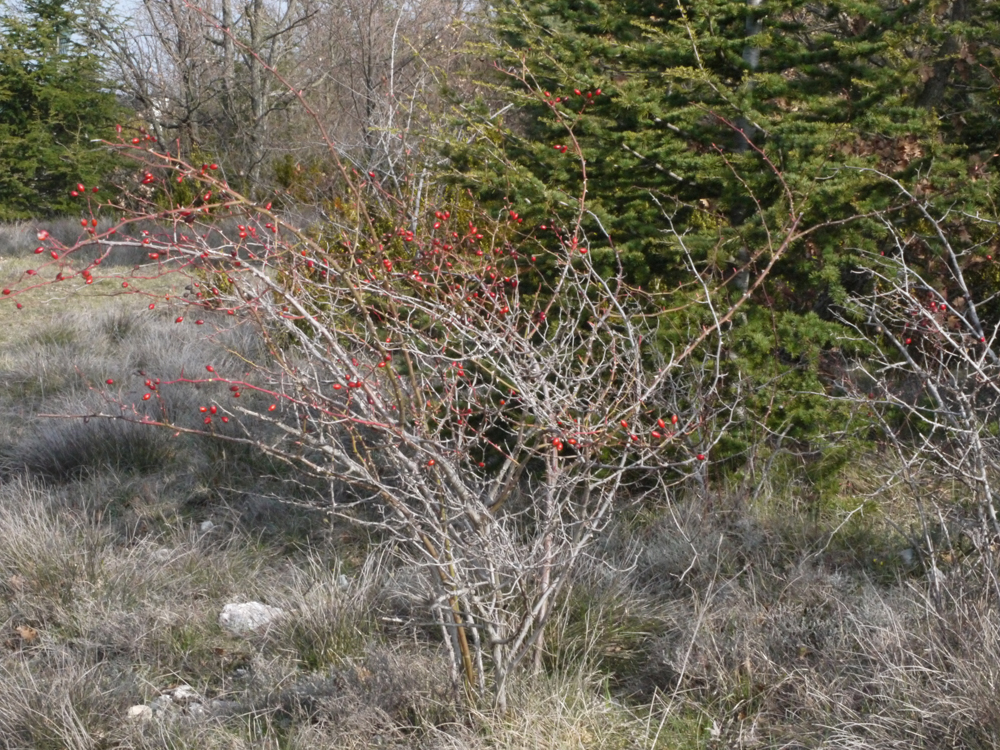
Hips remain after leaves abscise.

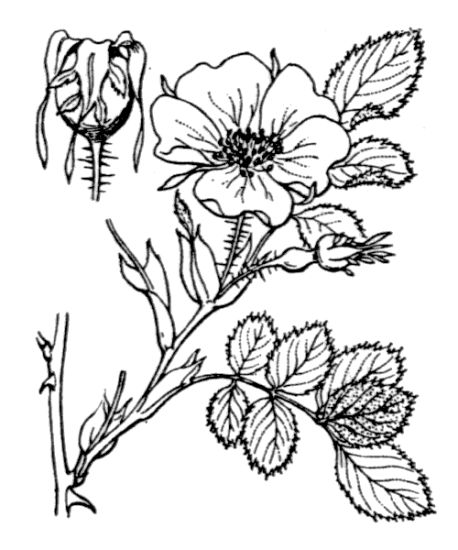
Botanical illustration

== Genetics ==
Unlike some other species in Rosa sect. Caninae which are pentaploid with an unusual meiosis referred to as permanent odd polyploidy, R. micrantha has been found to be hexaploid with fully sexual reproduction.
