= Rosa oxyodon =

Scientific classification
- Kingdom: Plantae
- Clade: Tracheophytes
- Clade: Angiosperms
- Clade: Eudicots
- Clade: Rosids
- Order: Rosales
- Family: Rosaceae
- Genus: Rosa
- Species: R. oxyodon

Binomial name
- Rosa oxyodon Boiss.

Species of wild rose

Rosa oxyodon is a species of wild rose native to the Caucasus. It is closely related to Rosa pendulina.

There have been various hypotheses about its evolutionary origin. According to one, it originated from the ancestor of R. pendulina as it migrated from Central Asia to Europe; in that view, the rare R. donetzica would be another relict of this migration. There is a second hypothesis, based on genetic data, which proposes that R. oxyodon arose as a separate species out of a series of hybridisations between R. majalis and R. pendulina.

The presence of Rosa oxyodon was reported in one place outside the Caucasus in 1967: in the Balkan Mountains of Bulgaria, specifically in a single location near Kozyata Stena. Although in subsequent Bulgarian literature it has been assumed that the species is native to the country, the case was re-examined by Polish botanist Jerzy Zieliński, who argued that the plants in question do not belong to R. oxyodon but instead represent a hybrid between R. pendulina and R. spinosissima.
