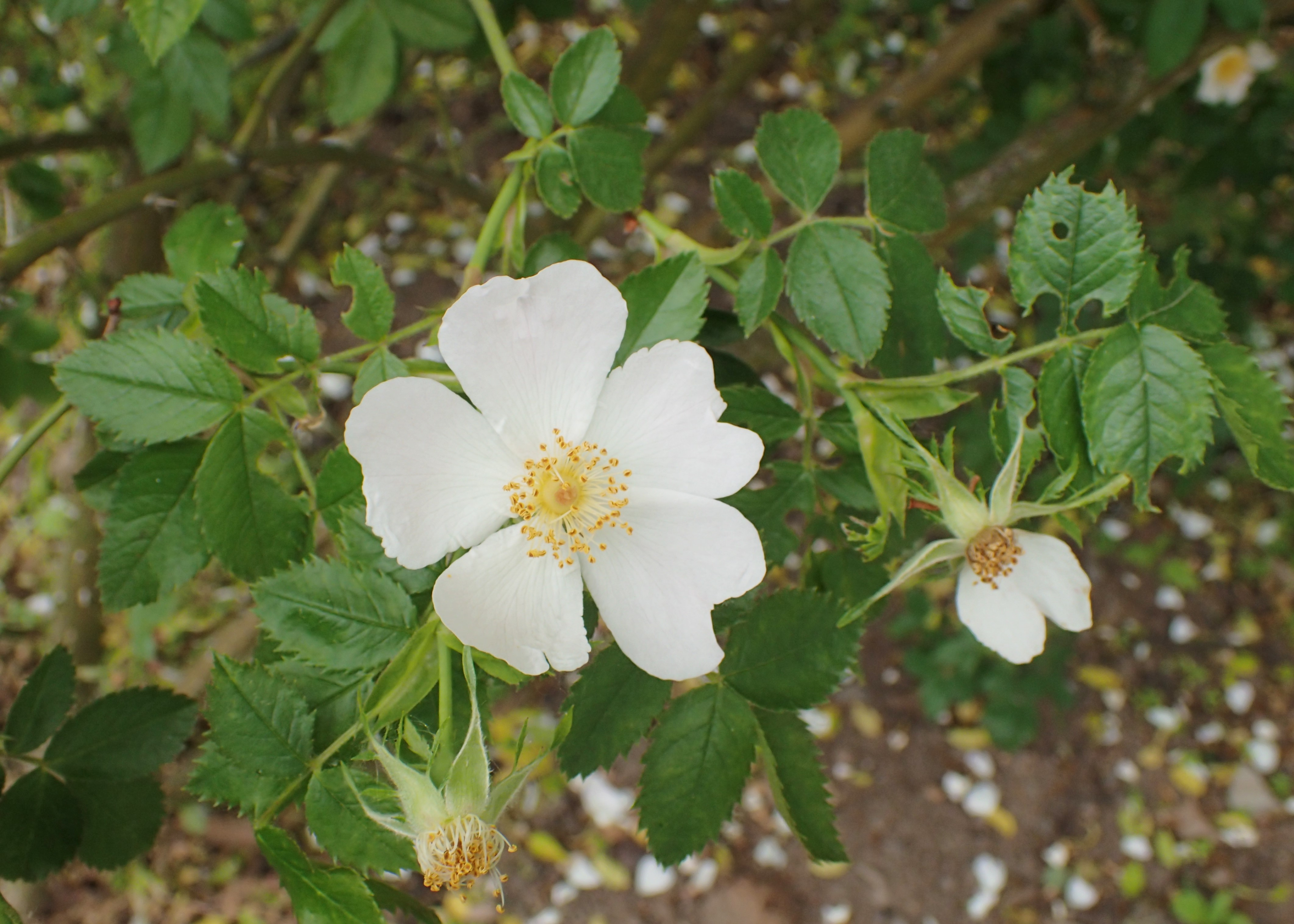
- Flowers

Scientific classification
- Kingdom: Plantae
- Clade: Embryophytes
- Clade: Tracheophytes
- Clade: Spermatophytes
- Clade: Angiosperms
- Clade: Eudicots
- Clade: Rosids
- Order: Rosales
- Family: Rosaceae
- Genus: Rosa
- Species: R. balsamica

Binomial name
- Rosa balsamica Besser

= Rosa balsamica =

Species of flowering plant

Rosa balsamica is a species of flowering plant in the family Rosaceae. It belongs to the genus Rosa and is commonly referred to as the round-leaved dog-rose.

It is native to a range extending from northwestern Africa across much of Europe to the Caucasus. It is uncertain whether it is native or established in Sicily. It has also been introduced to parts of the United States, including California, New Mexico, and Idaho.

It was first published in Catalogue des plantes du Jardin Botanique de Krzemieniec.

== Distribution ==
The round-leaved dog-rose is commonly found in parts of Central and Northern Europe, including Germany and Denmark, where it grows in hedgerows, woodland edges, and other temperate habitats.

== Taxonomy ==
Since its first description in 1815, it has accumulated more than 200 synonyms, including names based on different varieties and reclassifications under alternative taxonomic treatments across Europe and western Asia.

== Description ==
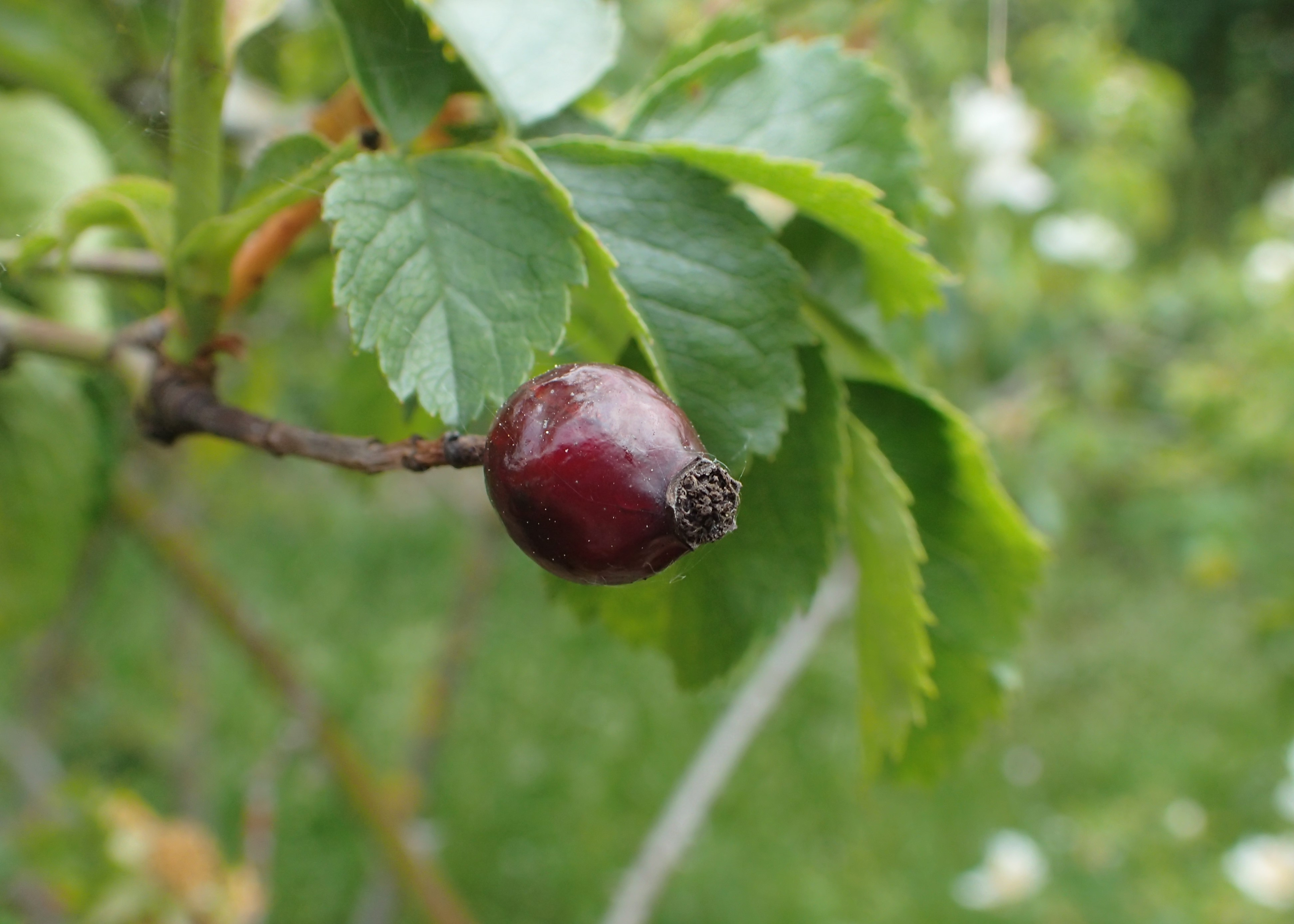
Mature fruit (rose hips)

This species produces white petals and has a woody, thorny stem characteristic of wild roses. The fruit is a red rose hip, which develops after flowering and becomes visible when mature.
