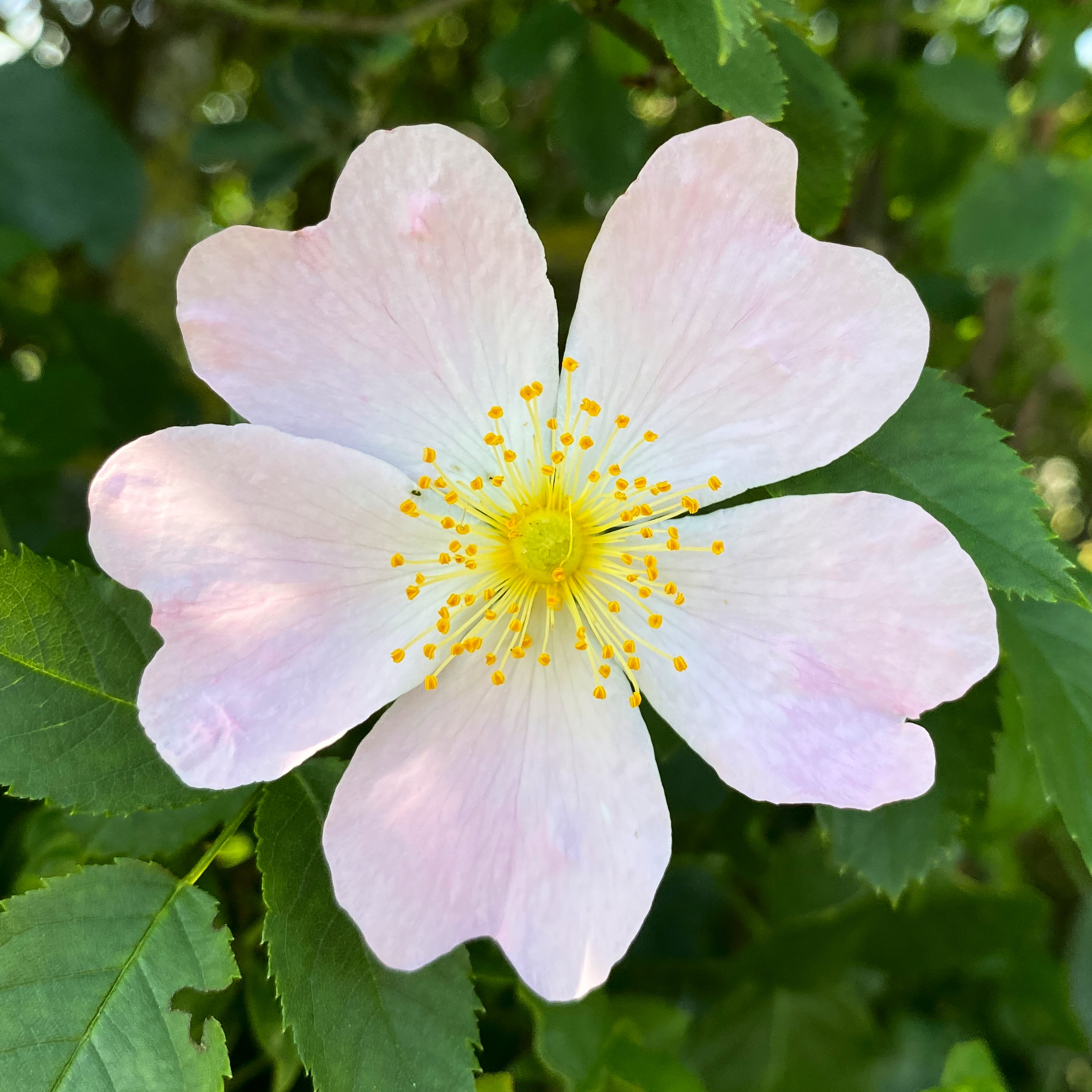
- Close-up of flower
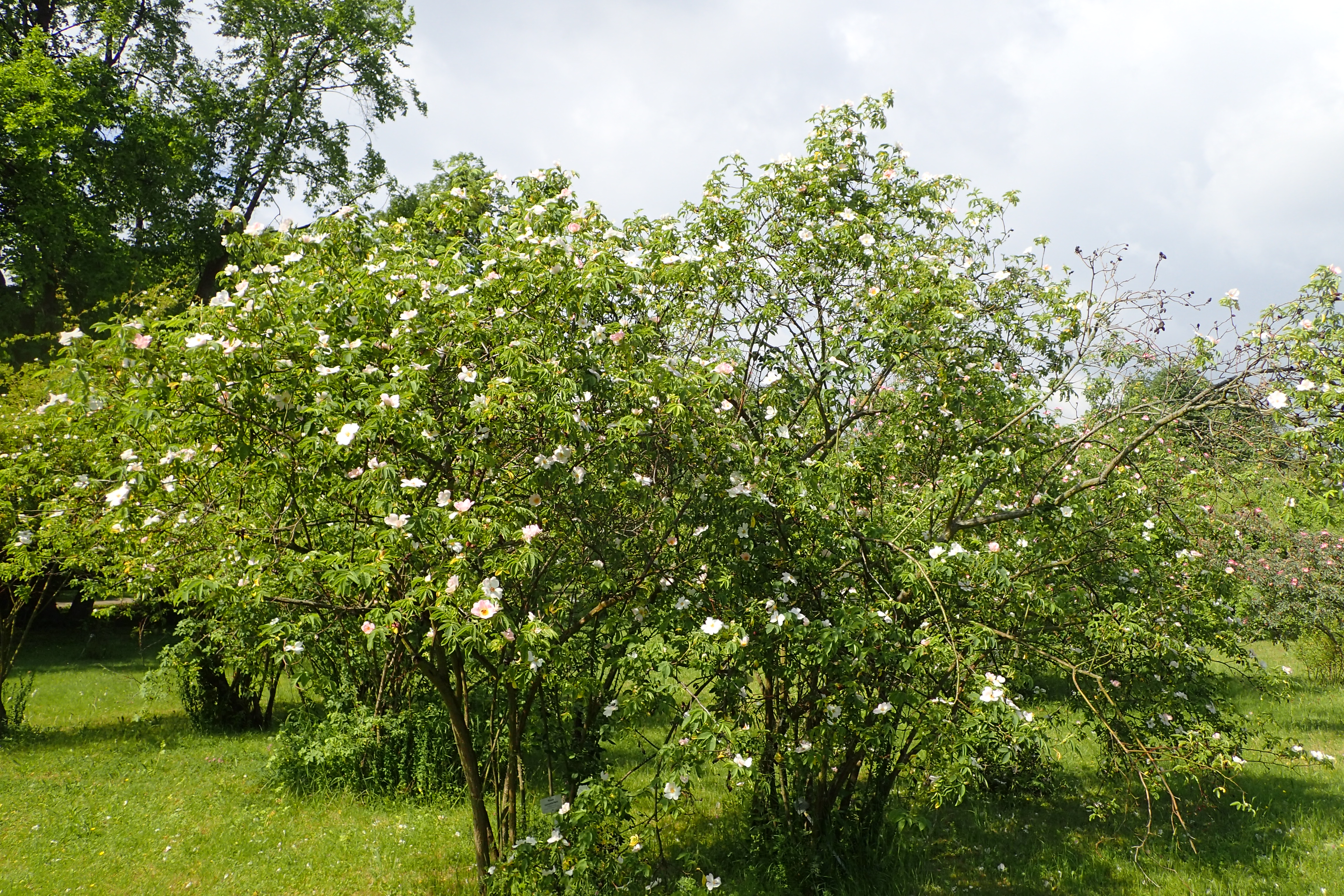
- Habit

Scientific classification
- Kingdom: Plantae
- Clade: Tracheophytes
- Clade: Angiosperms
- Clade: Eudicots
- Clade: Rosids
- Order: Rosales
- Family: Rosaceae
- Genus: Rosa
- Species: R. corymbifera

Binomial name
- Rosa corymbifera Borkh.

Synonyms
- List: Crepinia corymbifera (Borkh.) Gand.; Crepinia frutetorum (Besser) Gand.; Crepinia obtusifolia (Desv.) Gand.; Crepinia platyphylla (A.Rau) Gand.; Crepinia solstitialis (Besser) Gand.; Crepinia uncinella (Besser) Gand.; Crepinia urbica (Léman) Gand.; Rosa acanthina Déségl. & Ozanon; Rosa aemoniana f. valdonegensis R.Keller; Rosa aemoniana Puget ex R.Keller; Rosa affinita Puget ex Heinr.Braun; Rosa afzeliana subsp. subcollina (Christ) R.Keller; Rosa afzeliana var. hirtifolia (Heinr.Braun) R.Keller; Rosa afzeliana var. subcollina (Christ) R.Keller & Gams; Rosa amblyphylla Ripart ex Déségl.; Rosa amblyphylla var. suboxyphylla (Borbás) Heinr.Braun; Rosa annoniana Puget ex Heinr.Braun; Rosa arcana Déségl.; Rosa brilonensis G.H.Loos; Rosa burnatii (Christ) Burnat & Gremli; Rosa caesia subsp. subcollina (Christ) Hesl.-Harr.; Rosa caesia var. frutetorum (Besser) Druce; Rosa canina f. amblyphylla (Ripart ex Déségl.) Malinv.; Rosa canina var. arcana (Déségl.) R.Keller; Rosa canina var. bellezmensis R.Keller; Rosa canina var. collina Regel; Rosa canina var. corymbifera (Borkh.) Boulenger; Rosa canina subsp. corymbifera (Borkh.) C.Vicioso; Rosa canina var. frutetorum (Besser) P.V.Heath; Rosa canina f. hemitricha (Ripart ex Déségl.) Popek; Rosa canina var. hispidula (Ripart ex Déségl.) R.Keller; Rosa canina subvar. hispidula (Ripart ex Déségl.) R.Keller; Rosa canina f. obscura (Puget ex Déségl.) Borbás; Rosa canina var. obtusifolia (Desv.) Desv.; Rosa canina subsp. obtusifolia (Desv.) C.Vicioso; Rosa canina f. platyphylla (A.Rau) Popek; Rosa canina var. platyphylla (A.Rau) Malinv.; Rosa canina f. platyphylloides (Déségl. & Ripart) Malinv.; Rosa canina var. pseudocollina Christ; Rosa canina var. pseudohispidula R.Keller; Rosa canina var. serrata R.Keller; Rosa canina f. sphaeroidea (Ripart ex Déségl.) Borbás; Rosa canina var. sphaeroidea (Ripart ex Déségl.) Heinr.Braun; Rosa canina var. thuillieri (Christ) R.Keller & Gams; Rosa canina var. uncinella (Besser) R.Keller; Rosa canina var. urbica (Léman) Baker; Rosa canina urbica (Léman) Crép.; Rosa canina f. urbica (Léman) Malinv.; Rosa clavoides Gand.; Rosa clavoides var. stenocarpa Gand.; Rosa × collina var. corymbifera (Borkh.) J.B.Keller; Rosa × collina subsp. corymbifera (Borkh.) Nyman; Rosa × collina f. incerta (Déségl.) J.B.Keller; Rosa × collina var. incerta (Déségl.) Heinr.Braun; Rosa × collina var. obtusifolia (Desv.) Dumort.; Rosa × collina var. platyphylla (A.Rau) Dumort.; Rosa × collina var. tortuosa (Wierzb.) Heinr.Braun; Rosa × collina var. urbica (Léman) Dumort.; Rosa communis var. acanthina (Déségl. & Ozanon) Rouy & E.G.Camus; Rosa communis var. amblyphylla (Ripart ex Déségl.) Rouy & E.G.Camus; Rosa communis var. burnatii (Christ) Rouy & E.G.Camus; Rosa communis var. corymbifera (Borkh.) Rouy & E.G.Camus; Rosa communis var. gabrielis (F.Gérard) Rouy & E.G.Camus; Rosa communis var. gabrielis (F.Gérard) Rouy & E.G.Camus; Rosa communis var. globata (Déségl.) Rouy & E.G.Camus; Rosa communis var. hemitricha (Ripart ex Déségl.) Rouy & E.G.Camus; Rosa communis var. hispidula (Ripart ex Déségl.) Rouy & E.G.Camus; Rosa communis var. imitata (Déségl.) Rouy & E.G.Camus; Rosa communis var. jactata (Déségl.) Rouy & E.G.Camus; Rosa communis var. obscura (Puget ex Déségl.) Rouy & E.G.Camus; Rosa communis var. obtusifolia (Desv.) Rouy & E.G.Camus; Rosa communis var. platyphylla (A.Rau) Rouy & E.G.Camus; Rosa communis var. platyphylloides (Déségl. & Ripart) Rouy & E.G.Camus; Rosa communis var. ramealis (Puget ex Déségl.) Rouy & E.G.Camus; Rosa communis var. semiglabra (Ripart ex Cariot) Rouy & E.G.Camus; Rosa communis var. sphaerocarpa (Puget ex Crép.) Rouy & E.G.Camus; Rosa communis var. sphaeroidea (Ripart ex Déségl.) Rouy & E.G.Camus; Rosa communis var. trichoidea (Ripart ex Déségl.) Rouy & E.G.Camus; Rosa communis var. urbica (Léman) Rouy & E.G.Camus; Rosa communis var. vaulxiana (Moutin) Rouy & E.G.Camus; Rosa coriifolia var. frutetorum (Besser) Dumort.; Rosa coriifolia subsp. frutetorum (Besser) Heinr.Braun; Rosa coriifolia f. frutetorum (Besser) Christ; Rosa coriifolia var. hirtifolia (Heinr.Braun) R.Keller; Rosa coriifolia var. subcollina (Christ) Borbás; Rosa coriifolia subsp. subcollina (Christ) Arcang.; Rosa coriifolia f. subcollina Christ; Rosa corymbifera var. angustata Chrshan.; Rosa corymbifera var. bicolor (Schmalh.) Chrshan.; Rosa corymbifera var. dipilata Lonacz. ex Chrshan.; Rosa corymbifera var. oksijukii Chrshan.; Rosa corymbifera var. pendunculis-pilosis (Degen ex Boros) Ker.-Nagy; Rosa corymbifera var. querceta Chrshan.; Rosa corymbifera var. salicifolia Lonacz.; Rosa corymbifera var. setosopedicellata Chrshan.; Rosa corymbifera var. solstitialis (Besser) Chrshan.; Rosa corymbifera var. umbrosa Litv. ex Chrshan.; Rosa corymbifera var. uncinella (Besser) Chrshan.; Rosa corymbifera var. wichurae (Heinr.Braun) Ker.-Nagy; Rosa corymbifera var. zebeldensis Lonacz.; Rosa deseglisei var. imitata (Déségl.) Boullu; Rosa dumalis f. sphaeroidea (Ripart ex Déségl.) Nyár.; Rosa dumalis subsp. subcollina (Christ) Schur; Rosa × dumetorum var. acanthina (Déségl. & Ozanon) Heinr.Braun; Rosa × dumetorum subvar. acanthina (Déségl. & Ozanon) R.Keller; Rosa × dumetorum var. affinita (Puget ex Heinr.Braun) Heinr.Braun; Rosa × dumetorum f. amblyphylla (Ripart ex Déségl.) Borbás; Rosa × dumetorum var. amblyphylla (Ripart ex Déségl.) Heinr.Braun; Rosa × dumetorum amblyphylla (Ripart ex Déségl.) R.Keller; Rosa × dumetorum f. annoniana (Puget ex Heinr.Braun) Heinr.Braun; Rosa × dumetorum var. bicolor Schmalh.; Rosa × dumetorum subvar. burnatii (Christ) R.Keller; Rosa × dumetorum var. burnatii (Christ) Burnat & Gremli; Rosa × dumetorum var. ciliata (Borbás) Heinr.Braun; Rosa × dumetorum f. ciliata Borbás; Rosa × dumetorum eulanceolata (Heinr.Braun) R.Keller; Rosa × dumetorum var. eulanceolata (Heinr.Braun) Heinr.Braun; Rosa × dumetorum var. forsteri (Sm.) Heinr.Braun; Rosa × dumetorum var. gabrielis (F.Gérard) R.Keller; Rosa × dumetorum subvar. globata (Déségl.) R.Keller; Rosa × dumetorum var. globata (Déségl.) Heinr.Braun; Rosa × dumetorum f. globata (Déségl.) Borbás; Rosa × dumetorum f. hemitricha (Ripart ex Déségl.) Borbás; Rosa × dumetorum var. hemitricha (Ripart ex Déségl.) Heinr.Braun; Rosa × dumetorum subvar. heterotricha (Borbás) R.Keller; Rosa × dumetorum f. heterotricha Borbás; Rosa × dumetorum var. hillebrandtii (Weitenw.) Heinr.Braun; Rosa × dumetorum var. hirta (Heinr.Braun) Heinr.Braun; Rosa × dumetorum var. hirtifolia (Heinr.Braun) Heinr.Braun; Rosa × dumetorum var. hispidula (Ripart ex Déségl.) Prodan; Rosa × dumetorum subvar. hispidula (Ripart ex Déségl.) R.Keller; Rosa × dumetorum subvar. imitata (Déségl.) R.Keller; Rosa × dumetorum var. incerta (Déségl.) Wolley-Dod; Rosa × dumetorum var. juncta (Puget ex Heinr.Braun) Heinr.Braun; Rosa × dumetorum f. obscura (Puget ex Déségl.) Borbás; Rosa × dumetorum var. obscura (Puget ex Déségl.) Heinr.Braun; Rosa × dumetorum f. obtusifolia (Desv.) Christ; Rosa × dumetorum subsp. obtusifolia (Desv.) Arcang.; Rosa × dumetorum var. obtusifolia (Desv.) Chevall.; Rosa × dumetorum subsp. obtusifolia (Desv.) J.B.Keller; Rosa × dumetorum subvar. perciliata (Heinr.Braun) R.Keller; Rosa × dumetorum var. perciliata Heinr.Braun; Rosa × dumetorum var. peropaca Heinr.Braun; Rosa × dumetorum var. platyphylla (A.Rau) Burnat ex Crép.; Rosa × dumetorum subsp. platyphylla (A.Rau) Arcang.; Rosa × dumetorum f. platyphylla (A.Rau) Christ; Rosa × dumetorum var. platyphylloides (Déségl. & Ripart) Heinr.Braun; Rosa × dumetorum f. platyphylloides (Déségl. & Ripart) Borbás; Rosa × dumetorum subvar. platyphylloides (Déségl. & Ripart) R.Keller; Rosa × dumetorum var. puberula (J.B.Keller) Heinr.Braun; Rosa × dumetorum subvar. ramealis (Puget ex Déségl.) R.Keller; Rosa × dumetorum subf. ramealis (Puget ex Déségl.) Heinr.Braun; Rosa × dumetorum f. ramealis (Puget ex Déségl.) Borbás; Rosa × dumetorum subvar. reussii (Heinr.Braun) R.Keller; Rosa × dumetorum var. reussii (Heinr.Braun) Heinr.Braun; Rosa × dumetorum f. richteri (Heinr.Braun) Borza; Rosa × dumetorum var. rivularis (Heinr.Braun & Borbás) Heinr.Braun; Rosa × dumetorum f. semiglabra (Ripart ex Déségl.) Borbás; Rosa × dumetorum subvar. semiglabra (Ripart ex Déségl.) R.Keller; Rosa × dumetorum var. semiglabra (Ripart ex Déségl.) Heinr.Braun; Rosa × dumetorum subvar. solstitialis (Besser) R.Keller; Rosa × dumetorum var. solstitialis (Besser) Schmalh.; Rosa × dumetorum f. solstitialis (Besser) Borbás; Rosa × dumetorum subsp. solstitialis (Besser) Heinr.Braun; Rosa × dumetorum subvar. sphaerocarpa (Puget ex Crép.) R.Keller; Rosa × dumetorum var. sphaerocarpa (Puget ex Crép.) Heinr.Braun; Rosa × dumetorum f. subatrichostylis Borbás; Rosa × dumetorum var. subatrichostylis (Borbás) Heinr.Braun; Rosa × dumetorum f. subcollina (Christ) L.A.W.Hasse; Rosa × dumetorum suboxyphylla (Borbás) R.Keller; Rosa × dumetorum var. suboxyphylla (Borbás) Heinr.Braun; Rosa × dumetorum f. suboxyphylla Borbás; Rosa × dumetorum f. thuillieri Christ; Rosa × dumetorum var. thuillieri (Christ) Gremli; Rosa × dumetorum subvar. trichoidea (Ripart ex Déségl.) R.Keller; Rosa × dumetorum subsp. uncinella (Besser) Hayek; Rosa × dumetorum uncinella (Besser) R.Keller; Rosa × dumetorum var. uncinella (Besser) Heinr.Braun; Rosa × dumetorum f. uncinella (Besser) Borbás; Rosa × dumetorum var. urbica (Léman) R.Keller; Rosa × dumetorum subsp. urbica (Léman) Nyman; Rosa × dumetorum f. urbica (Léman) Christ; Rosa × dumetorum subvar. vaulxiana (Moutin) R.Keller; Rosa dumetorum var. wichurae Heinr.Braun; Rosa eulanceolata Heinr.Braun; Rosa forsteri Sm.; Rosa froebelii Christ ex Froebel; Rosa frutetorum Besser; Rosa frutetorum var. silesiaca Heinr.Braun; Rosa gabrielis F.Gérard; Rosa glauca subsp. subcollina (Christ) Schwertschl.; Rosa glauca f. subcollina (Christ) Fiori; Rosa glauca var. subcollina (Christ) Rouy; Rosa globata Déségl.; Rosa hemitricha Ripart ex Déségl.; Rosa hemitricha var. beugesiaca Boullu; Rosa hemitricha var. pendunculis-pilosis Degen ex Boros; Rosa hillebrandtii Weitenw.; Rosa hirta Heinr.Braun; Rosa hirta subsp. globata (Déségl.) Heinr.Braun; Rosa hirtifolia Heinr.Braun; Rosa hirtifolia var. genuina Heinr.Braun; Rosa hirtifolia var. hontiensis Heinr.Braun; Rosa hispidula Ripart ex Déségl.; Rosa imitata Déségl.; Rosa incerta Déségl.; Rosa incerta var. tortuosa (Wierzb.) Posp.; Rosa incerta var. typica Posp.; Rosa jactata Déségl.; Rosa juncta (Puget ex Heinr.Braun) Heinr.Braun; Rosa kalmussiaca Chrshan. & Lasebna; Rosa lanceolata Opiz; Rosa lanceolata var. decalvata Crép. ex Heinr.Braun; Rosa lanceolata var. heterotricha (Borbás) Heinr.Braun; Rosa lanceolata var. microphylla Opiz ex Heinr.Braun; Rosa lapidosa Dubovik; Rosa montana Steven ex Tratt.; Rosa montana Steven ex Besser; Rosa obscura Puget; Rosa obscura Puget ex Déségl.; Rosa obtusifolia Desv.; Rosa opaca Gren.; Rosa platyphylla A.Rau; Rosa platyphylla var. ciliata (Borbás) Posp.; Rosa platyphylla subsp. hirtifolia (Heinr.Braun) Heinr.Braun; Rosa platyphylla var. platyphylloides (Déségl. & Ripart) Boullu; Rosa platyphylla var. uncinella (Besser) Posp.; Rosa platyphylloides Déségl. & Ripart; Rosa ramealis Puget ex Déségl.; Rosa rammiorum N.V.Mironova; Rosa reussii Heinr.Braun; Rosa reuteri f. subcollina Christ; Rosa reuteri var. subcollina (Christ) Wolley-Dod; Rosa richteri Heinr.Braun; Rosa rivularis Heinr.Braun & Borbás; Rosa schmalhauseniana Chrshan.; Rosa schmalhauseniana var. leiopedicellata Chrshan.; Rosa schmalhauseniana var. parvifoliolata Chrshan.; Rosa schmalhauseniana var. pilosa Chrshan.; Rosa schmalhauseniana var. stepposa Chrshan.; Rosa semiglabra Ripart ex Cariot; Rosa semiglabra Ripart ex Déségl.; Rosa solstitialis Besser; Rosa solstitialis var. brusnikensis J.B.Keller & Formánek; Rosa solstitialis f. caliacrae R.Keller & Prodan; Rosa solstitialis var. calvifrons J.B.Keller & Formánek; Rosa solstitialis denudata Gren.; Rosa solstitialis genuina Gren.; Rosa solstitialis glandulosa Gren.; Rosa solstitialis var. rariglanda Simonk.; Rosa solstitialis var. uskubensis J.B.Keller & Formánek; Rosa sphaerocarpa Puget ex Crép.; Rosa sphaerocarpa f. foenatis Prodan; Rosa sphaeroidea Ripart ex Déségl.; Rosa sphaeroidea var. chlumensis Wiesb.; Rosa sphaeroidea f. genuina Posp.; Rosa sphaeroidea var. posoniensis Heinr.Braun & Sabr.; Rosa sphaeroidea var. typica Posp.; Rosa steveniana F.Dietr.; Rosa subatrichostylis (Borbás) Heinr.Braun; Rosa subcollina (Christ) Vuk.; Rosa × submitis var. obscura (Puget ex Déségl.) Borbás; Rosa × submitis var. platyphylloides (Déségl. & Ripart) Borbás; Rosa × submitis var. ramealis (Puget ex Déségl.) Borbás; Rosa × submitis var. solstitalis (Besser) Borbás; Rosa taurica M.Bieb.; Rosa tesquicola Dubovik; Rosa tomentella subsp. affinis Godr.; Rosa tomentella f. burnatii Christ; Rosa tomentella f. obtusifolia (Desv.) R.Keller; Rosa tomentella var. obtusifolia (Desv.) Corb.; Rosa tortuosa Wierzb.; Rosa trichoidea Ripart ex Déségl.; Rosa uncinella Besser; Rosa uncinella var. affinita (Puget ex Heinr.Braun) Heinr.Braun; Rosa uncinella var. ciliata (Borbás) Borbás; Rosa uncinella var. heterotricha (Borbás) Borbás; Rosa uncinella subsp. juncta Puget ex Heinr.Braun; Rosa uncinella lanceolulata J.B.Keller & Wiesb.; Rosa uncinella oxyphylloides J.B.Keller & Wiesb.; Rosa uncinella var. subatrichostylis (Borbás) Borbás; Rosa uncinella var. tatrae Sagorski; Rosa urbica Léman; Rosa urbica f. affinita (Puget ex Heinr.Braun) Posp.; Rosa urbica var. baresanica Formánek; Rosa urbica var. decalvata Crép. ex J.B.Keller; Rosa urbica var. elisophylla J.B.Keller & Formánek; Rosa urbica f. eulanceolata (Heinr.Braun) Posp.; Rosa urbica f. genuina Posp.; Rosa urbica glandulosa Gren.; Rosa urbica var. globata (Déségl.) J.B.Keller; Rosa urbica f. globata (Déségl.) Posp.; Rosa urbica var. hemitricha (Ripart ex Déségl.) Boullu; Rosa urbica f. juncta (Puget ex Heinr.Braun) Posp.; Rosa urbica var. obscura (Puget ex Déségl.) Boullu; Rosa urbica f. perciliata (Heinr.Braun) Posp.; Rosa urbica f. peropaca (Heinr.Braun) Posp.; Rosa urbica f. platyphylloides (Déségl. & Ripart) Posp.; Rosa urbica var. puberula J.B.Keller; Rosa urbica ramealis (Puget ex Déségl.) J.B.Keller; Rosa urbica semiglabra (Ripart ex Déségl.) J.B.Keller; Rosa urbica var. semiglabra (Ripart ex Déségl.) Boullu; Rosa urbica f. sphaerocarpa (Puget ex Crép.) J.B.Keller; Rosa urbica var. typica Posp.; Rosa vaulxiana Moutin; Rosa vosagiaca var. subcollina (Christ) Dalla Torre & Sarnth. ex Malag.; Rosa wittmannii Heinr.Braun

= Rosa corymbifera =

Species of plant

Rosa corymbifera, the thicket dog rose, is a species of flowering plant in the family Rosaceae. It is native to northwestern Africa, nearly all of Europe, the Caucasus, the Middle East, and Central Asia. It primarily differs from the dog rose Rosa canina in having downier leaves, particularly on the abaxial surfaces (the undersides). The most widely used rootstock in Europe for garden roses is its cultivar 'Laxa'.

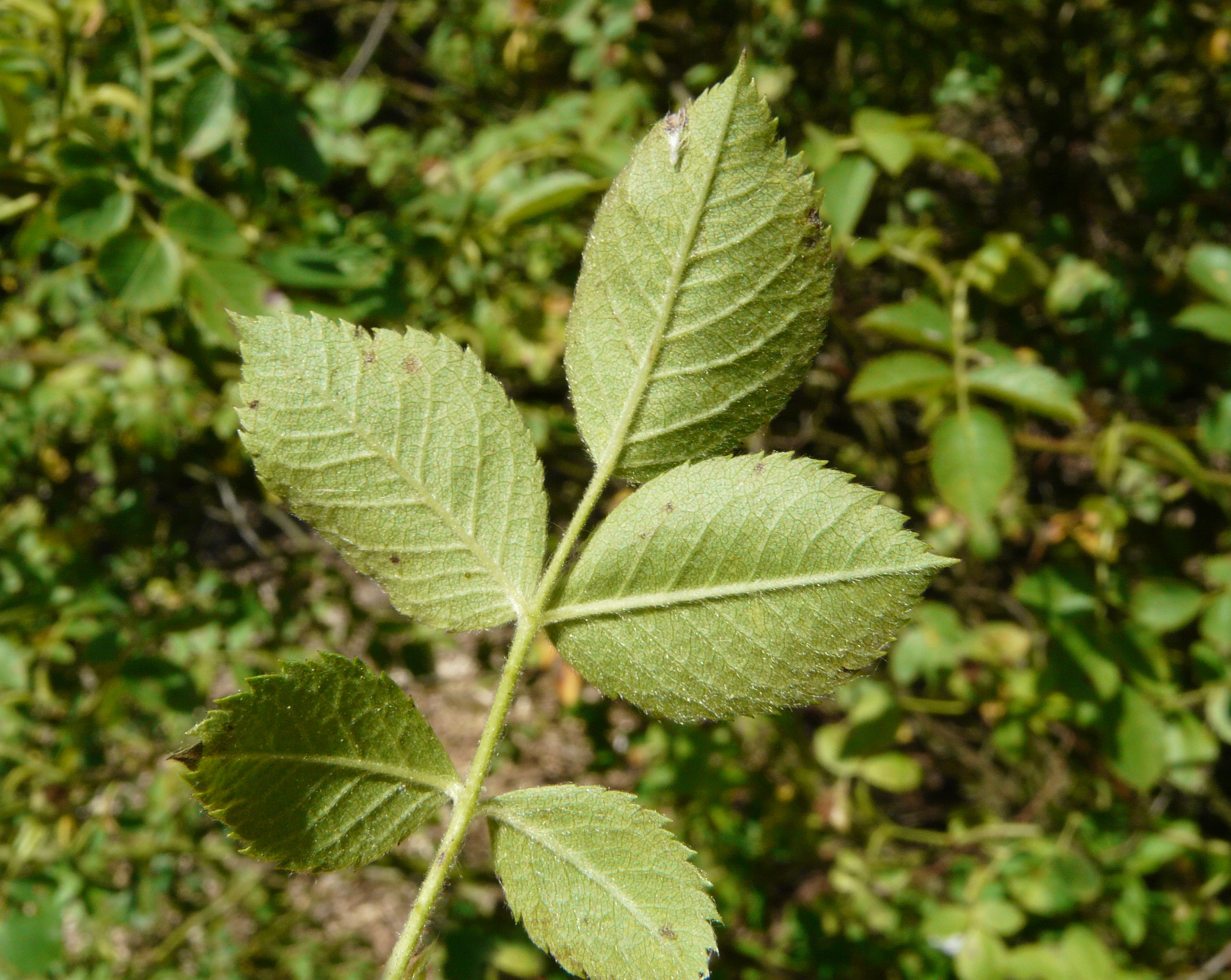
Underside of leaflets
