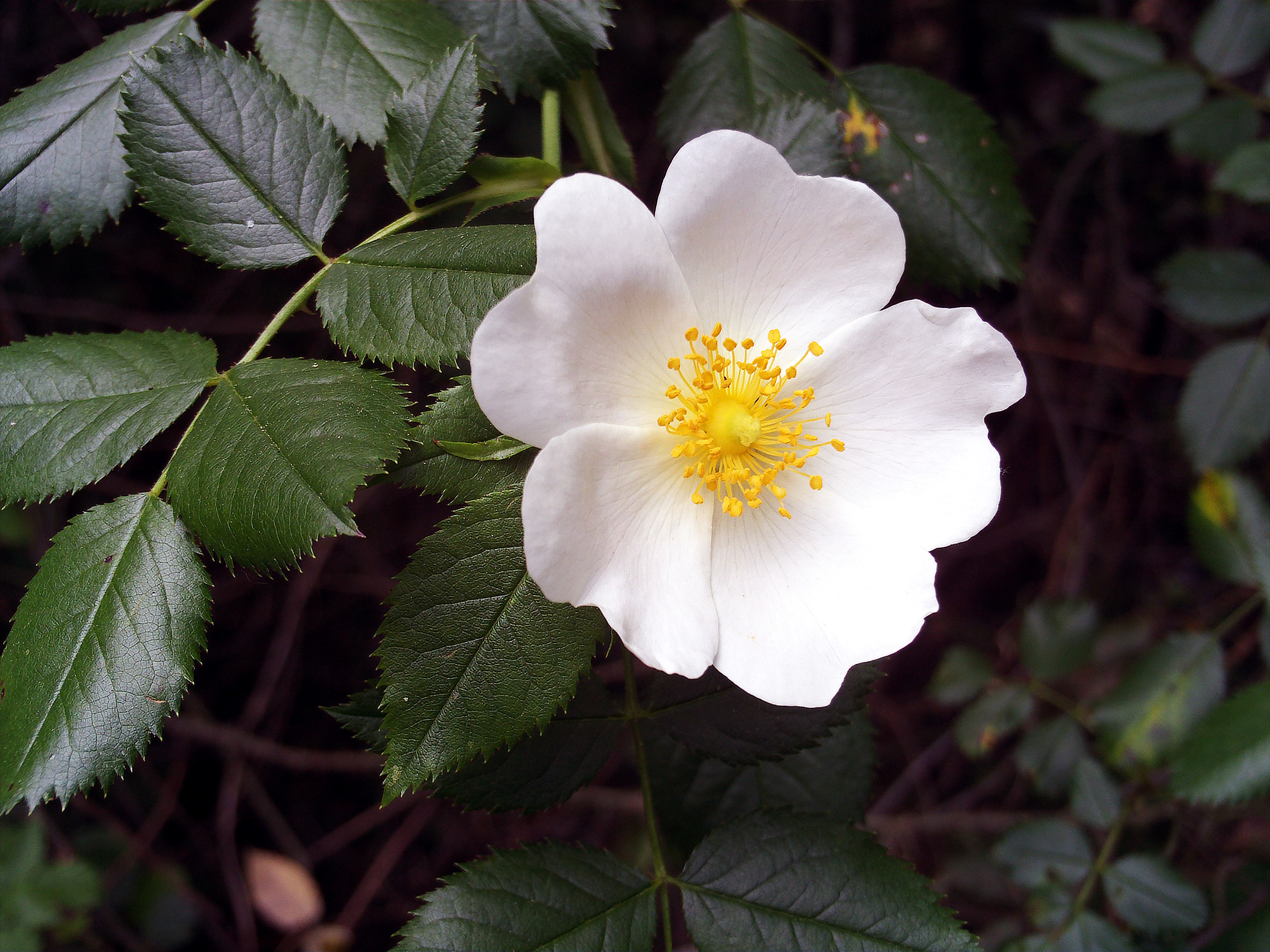

Scientific classification
- Kingdom: Plantae
- Clade: Tracheophytes
- Clade: Angiosperms
- Clade: Eudicots
- Clade: Rosids
- Order: Rosales
- Family: Rosaceae
- Genus: Rosa
- Species: R. pouzinii

Binomial name
- Rosa pouzinii Tratt.

= Rosa pouzinii =

Species of flowering plant

Rosa pouzinii is a species of wild rose native to Mediterranean Europe. It is found in Spain, Portugal, southern France, parts of Italy, and the larger Western Mediterranean islands: Mallorca, Sardinia, Corsica and Sicily. There have been reports of occurrences in Greece (including Crete), but these may have been erroneous.
