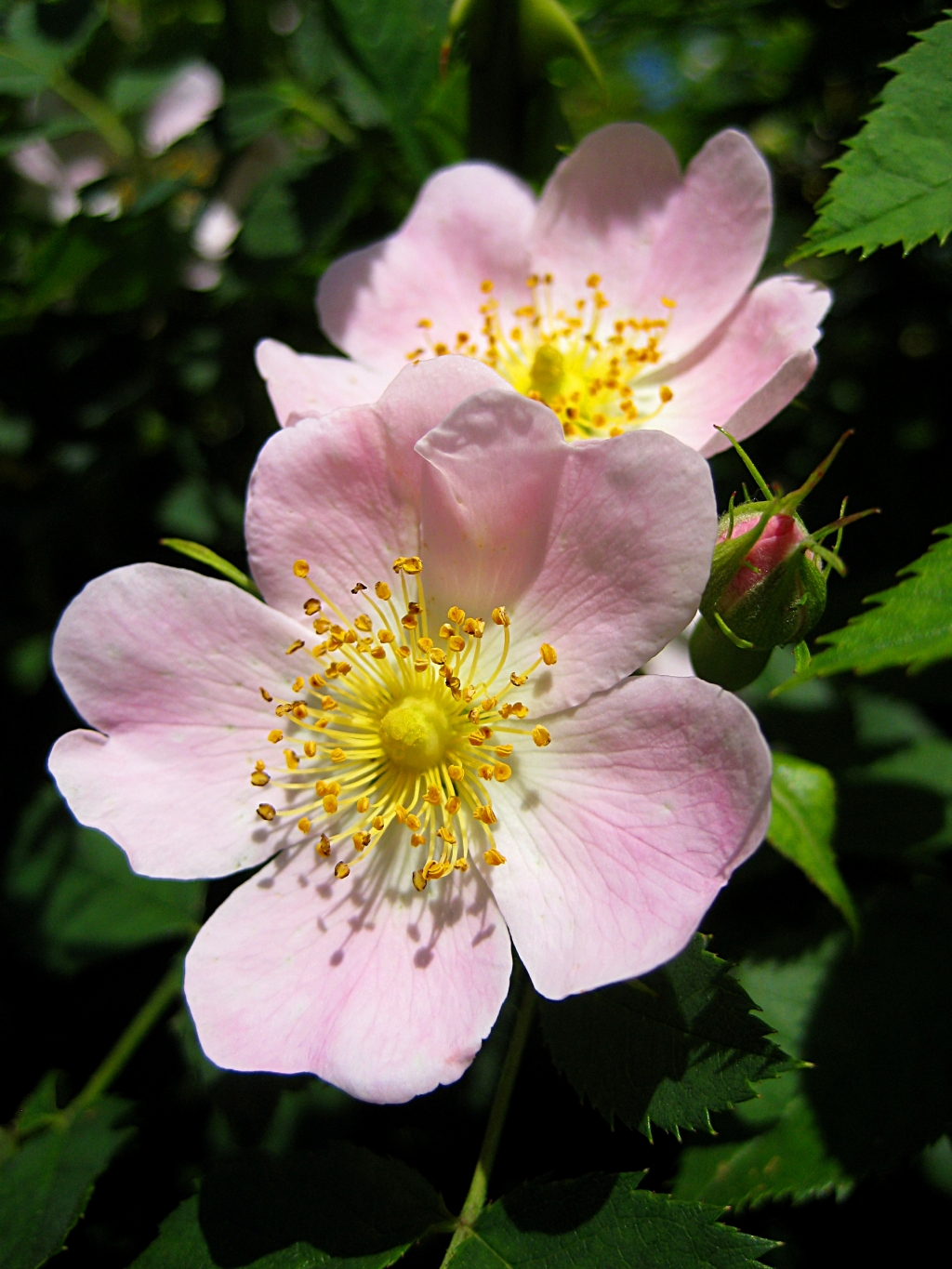

Scientific classification
- Kingdom: Plantae
- Clade: Tracheophytes
- Clade: Angiosperms
- Clade: Eudicots
- Clade: Rosids
- Order: Rosales
- Family: Rosaceae
- Genus: Rosa
- Subgenus: Rosa subg. Rosa
- Section: Rosa sect. Caninae

= Rosa sect. Caninae =

Section of plant

Rosa section Caninae is one of several sections of the genus Rosa. It includes Rosa canina, commonly known as the dog rose.

The group can be further subdivided into several subsections:

- Subsection Caninae
- Subsection Orientales
- Subsection Rubigineae
- Subsection Rubrifoliae
- Subsection Tomentellae
- Subsection Trachyphyllae
- Subsection Vestitae

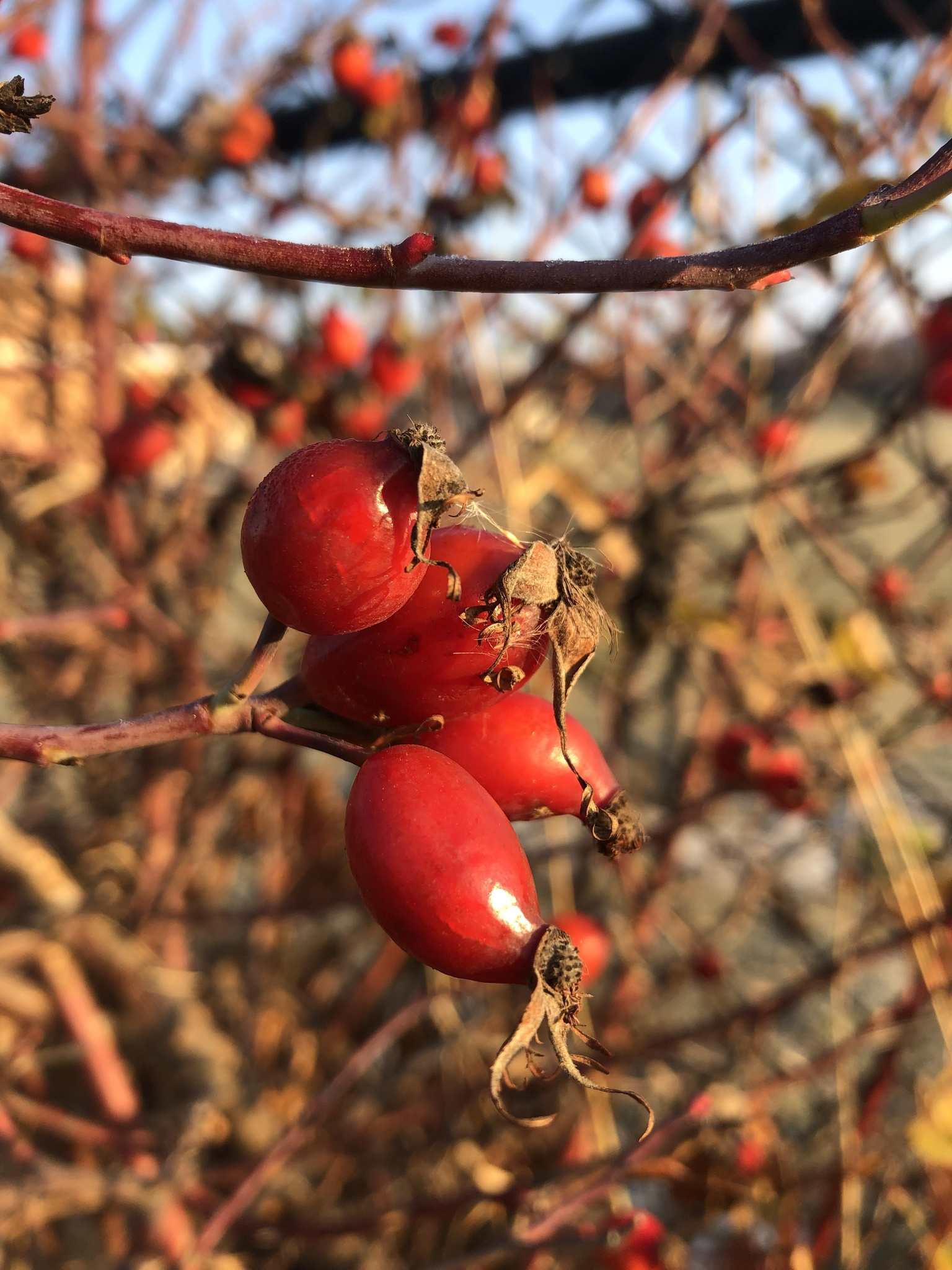
The rose-hips.

== See also ==
- Permanent odd polyploidy, an unusual form of meiosis found in this group.
