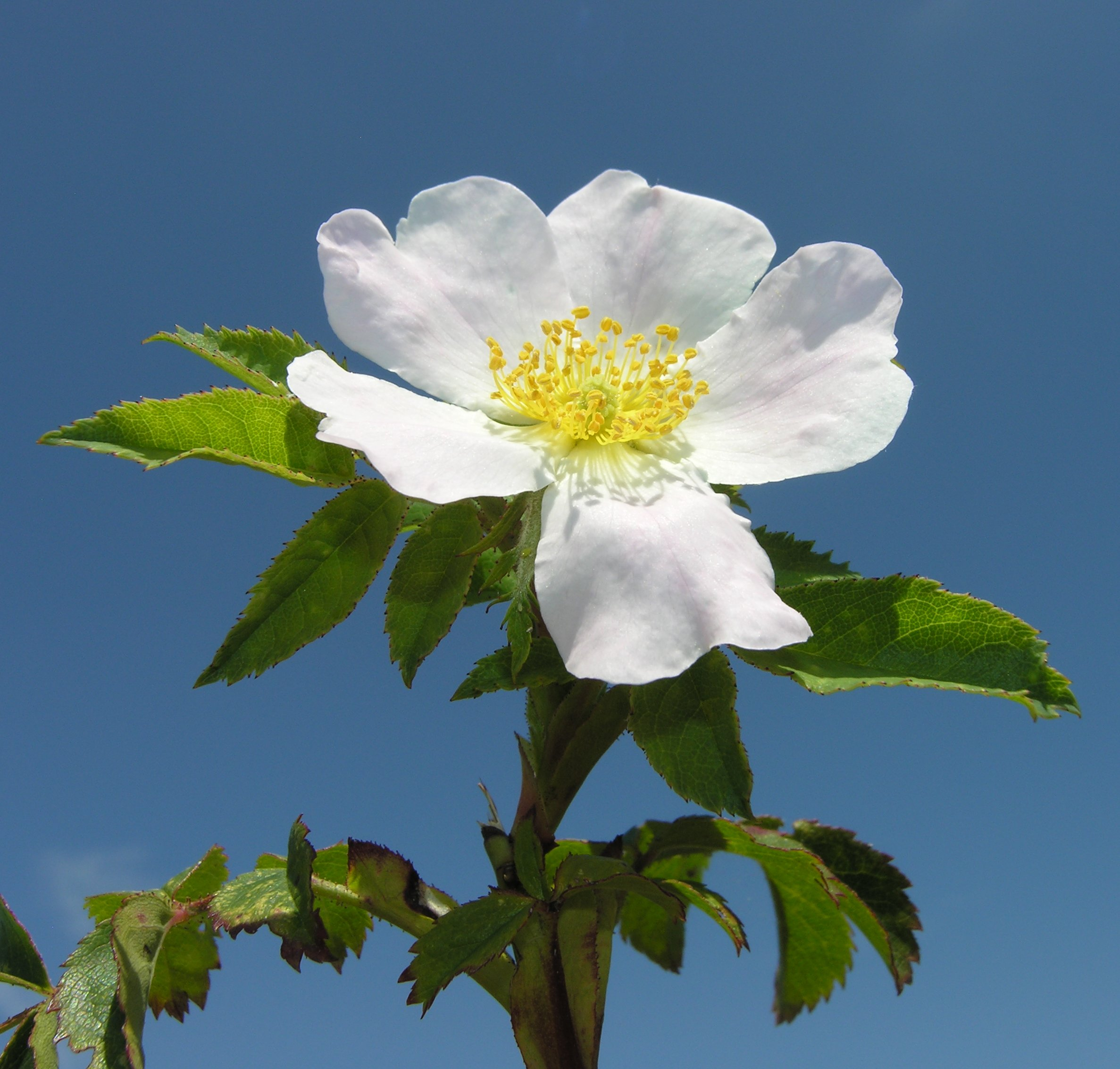

Scientific classification
- Kingdom: Plantae
- Clade: Tracheophytes
- Clade: Angiosperms
- Clade: Eudicots
- Clade: Rosids
- Order: Rosales
- Family: Rosaceae
- Genus: Rosa
- Species: R. agrestis

Binomial name
- Rosa agrestis Savi

Synonyms
- List: Rosa agrestis subsp. caryophyllacea E.Schenk; Rosa agrestis subsp. pubescens (Rapin ex Reut.) E.Schenk; Rosa arvatica Puget ex Baker; Rosa elliptica auct. angl., p.p.1298; Rosa elliptica subsp. inodora (Fr.) Schwertschl.; Rosa gisellae Koehne (spelling variant); Rosa gizellae Borb s; Rosa graveolens subsp. eriophora (Gren.) Arcang.; Rosa graveolens subsp. nuda (Gren.) Arcang.; Rosa haringiana (Heinr.Braun) Fritsch; Rosa hispanica H.Christ; Rosa kostrakiewiczii (Popek) Popek; Rosa sepium Thuill.; Rosa viscaria subsp. agrestis (Savi) Rouy

= Rosa agrestis =

Species of rose

Rosa agrestis, the small-leaved sweet briar, field briar or fieldbriar, is a species of wild rose native to Europe, found mostly in southern Europe and occasionally as far as the Caucasus. Sources differ on whether it can be found in northern Africa and Anatolia.

A dog rose, it is in the subgenus Rosa, section Caninae, and subsection Rubigineae.

It is a close relative of, and very similar to the sweet briar, Rosa rubiginosa, but with smaller leaves, white to blush petals, and very little odor from either the flowers or the leaves. Although it may be cultivated, most gardeners prefer the sweet briar for its scented foliage and pink flowers.

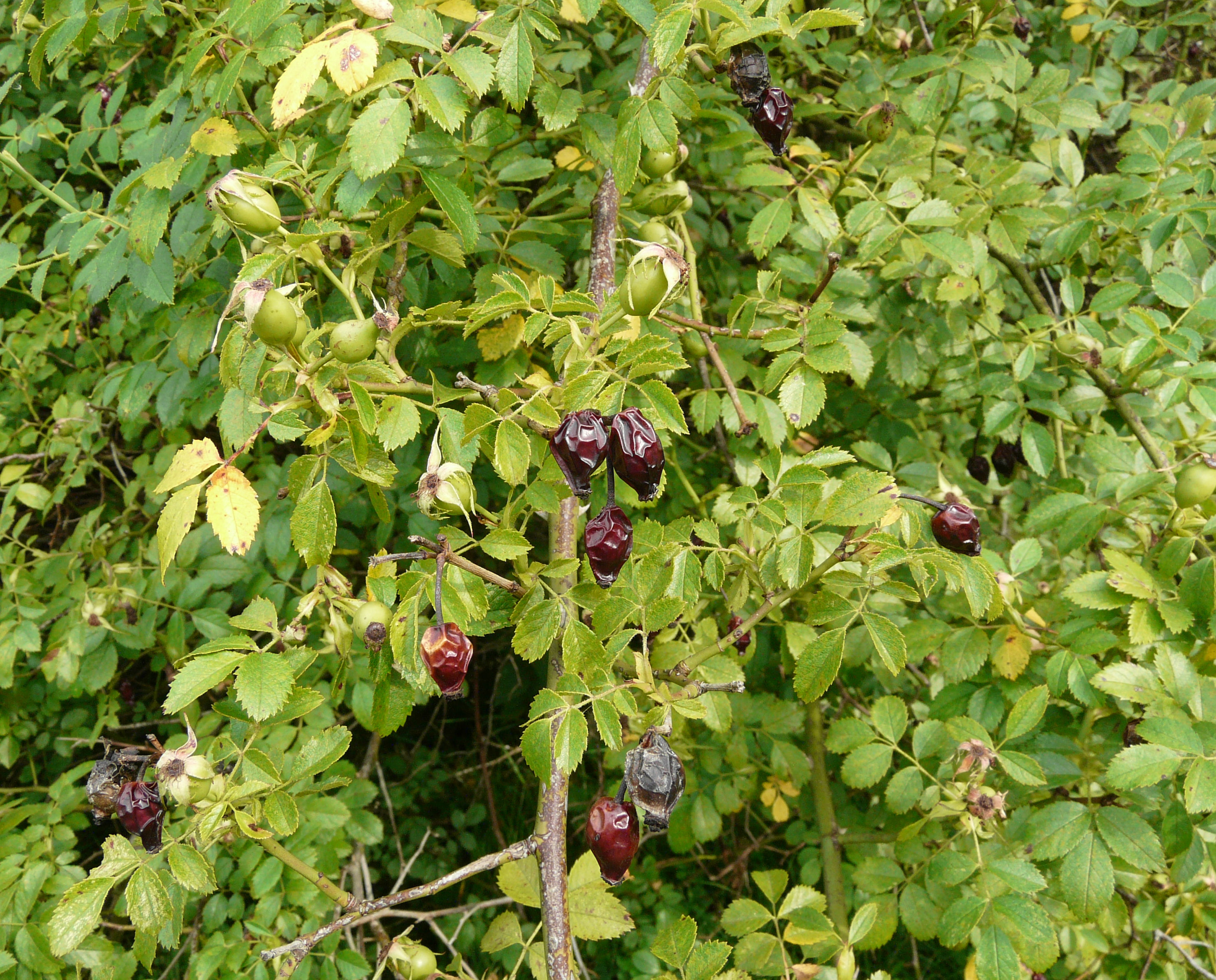
In fruit; ripe hips are retained on the plant

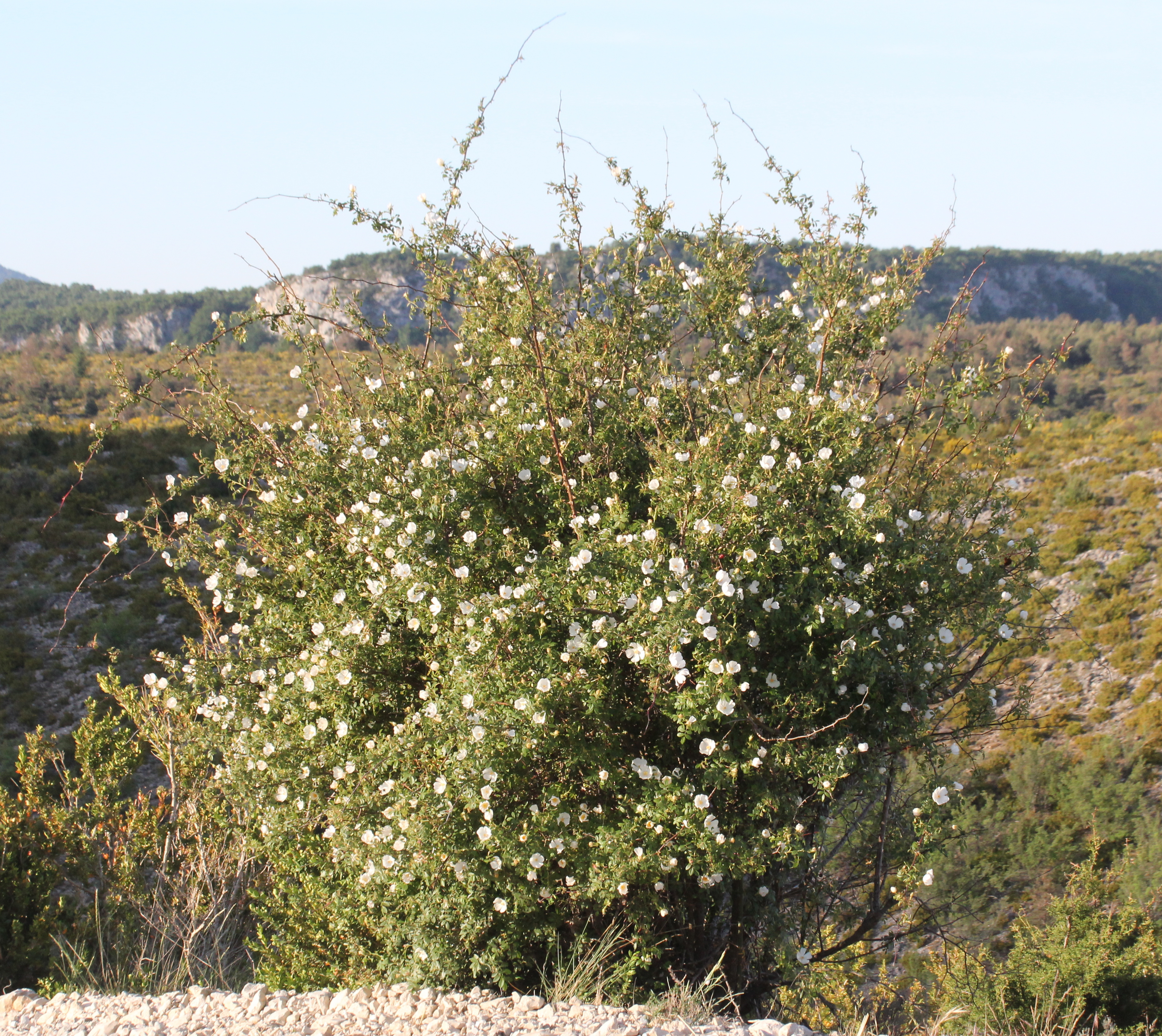
It may reach 3 m
