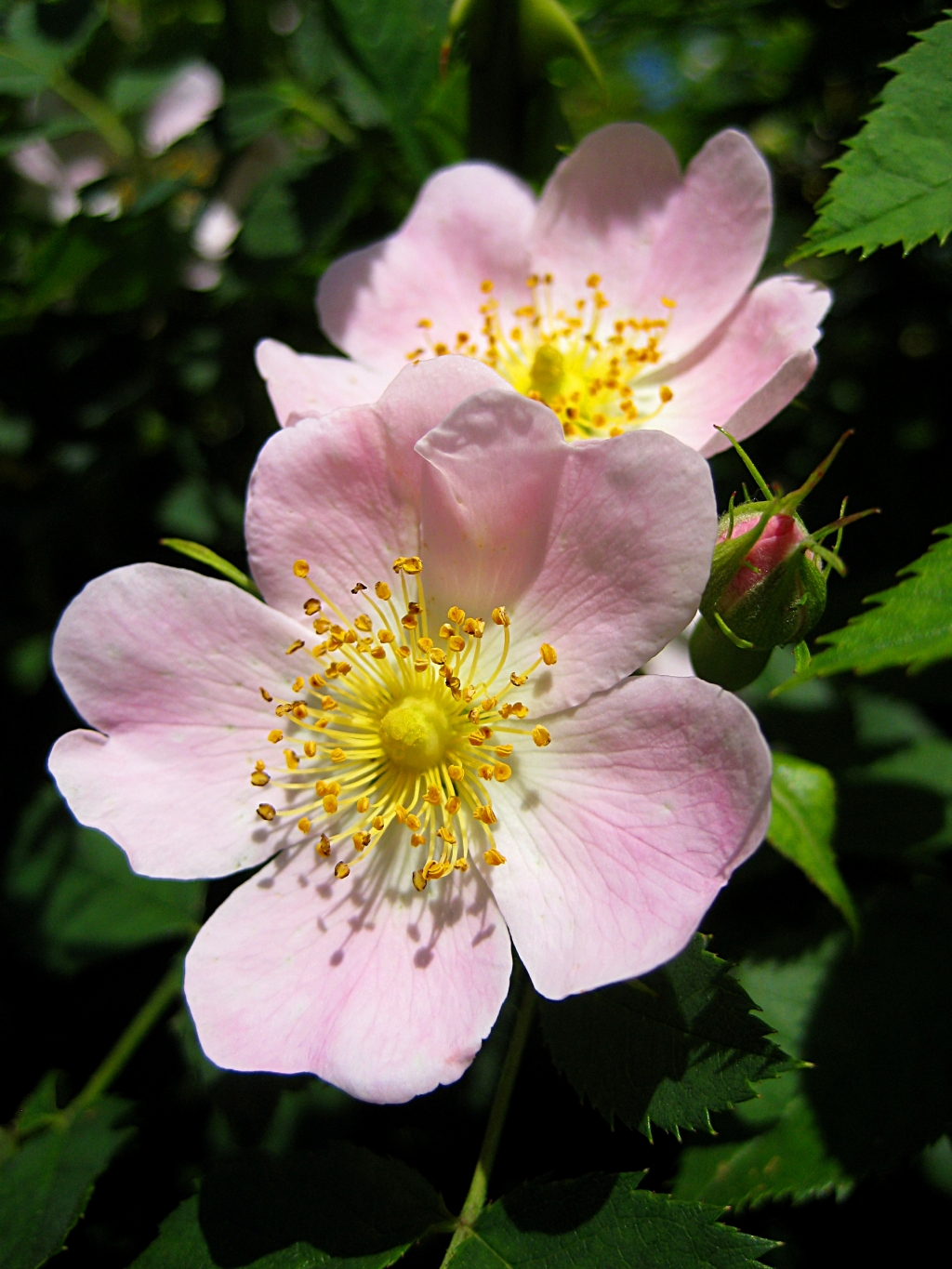

Scientific classification
- Kingdom: Plantae
- Clade: Tracheophytes
- Clade: Angiosperms
- Clade: Eudicots
- Clade: Rosids
- Order: Rosales
- Family: Rosaceae
- Genus: Rosa
- Species: R. canina

Binomial name
- Rosa canina L.

Synonyms
- See text

= Rosa canina =

Species of plant

Rosa canina, the dog rose, is a variable climbing, wild rose species native to Europe, northwest Africa, and western Asia.

== Description ==
The dog rose is a deciduous shrub normally ranging in height from 1–5 metres (3 1/2–16 1/2 ft), though it can scramble higher into the crowns of taller trees. Its multiple arching stems are covered with small, sharp, hooked prickles, which aid it in climbing. The leaves are pinnate, with 5–7 leaflets, and have a delicious fragrance when bruised.

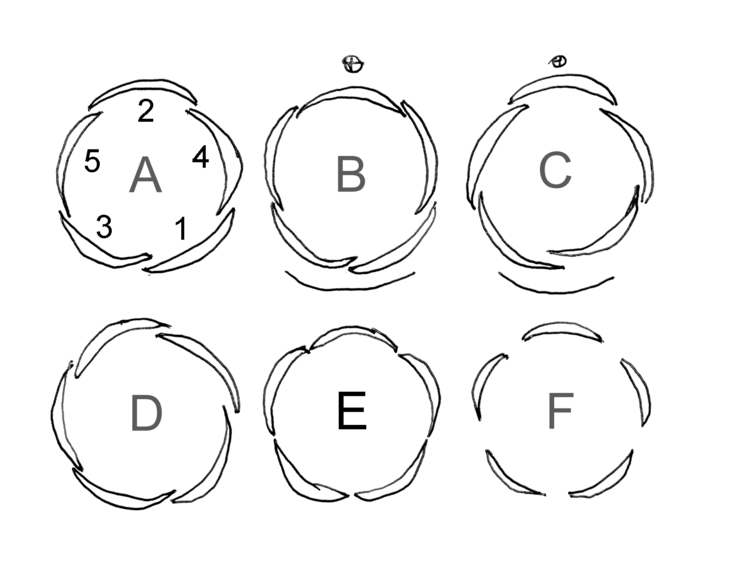
Quincuncial aestivation (A)

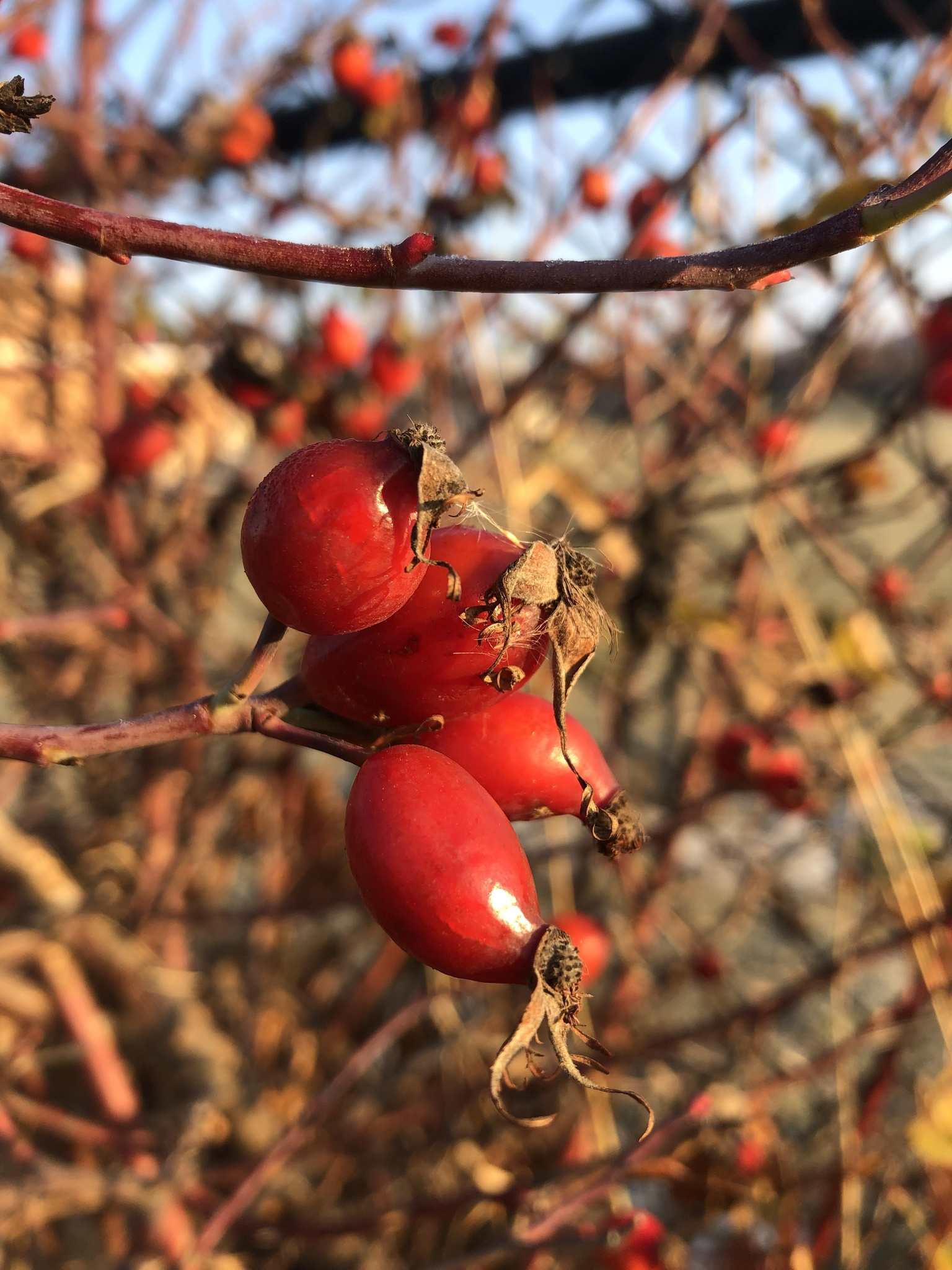
Close-up of rose hips

The dog rose blooms from June to July, with sweet-scented flowers that are usually pale pink, but can vary between a deep pink and white. They are 4–6 centimetres (1 1/2–2 1/2 in) in diameter with five petals. Like other roses it has a quincuncial aestivation. Unusually though, of its five sepals, when viewed from underneath, two are whiskered (or 'bearded') on both sides, two are quite smooth and one is whiskered on one side only. It has usually 10 or more pistils, and multiple stamens.

Flowers mature in September to October, into an oval, 1.5–2 cm (1/2–3/4 in), red-orange hips. The fruits can persist on the plant for several months (if not eaten by wildlife) and become black.

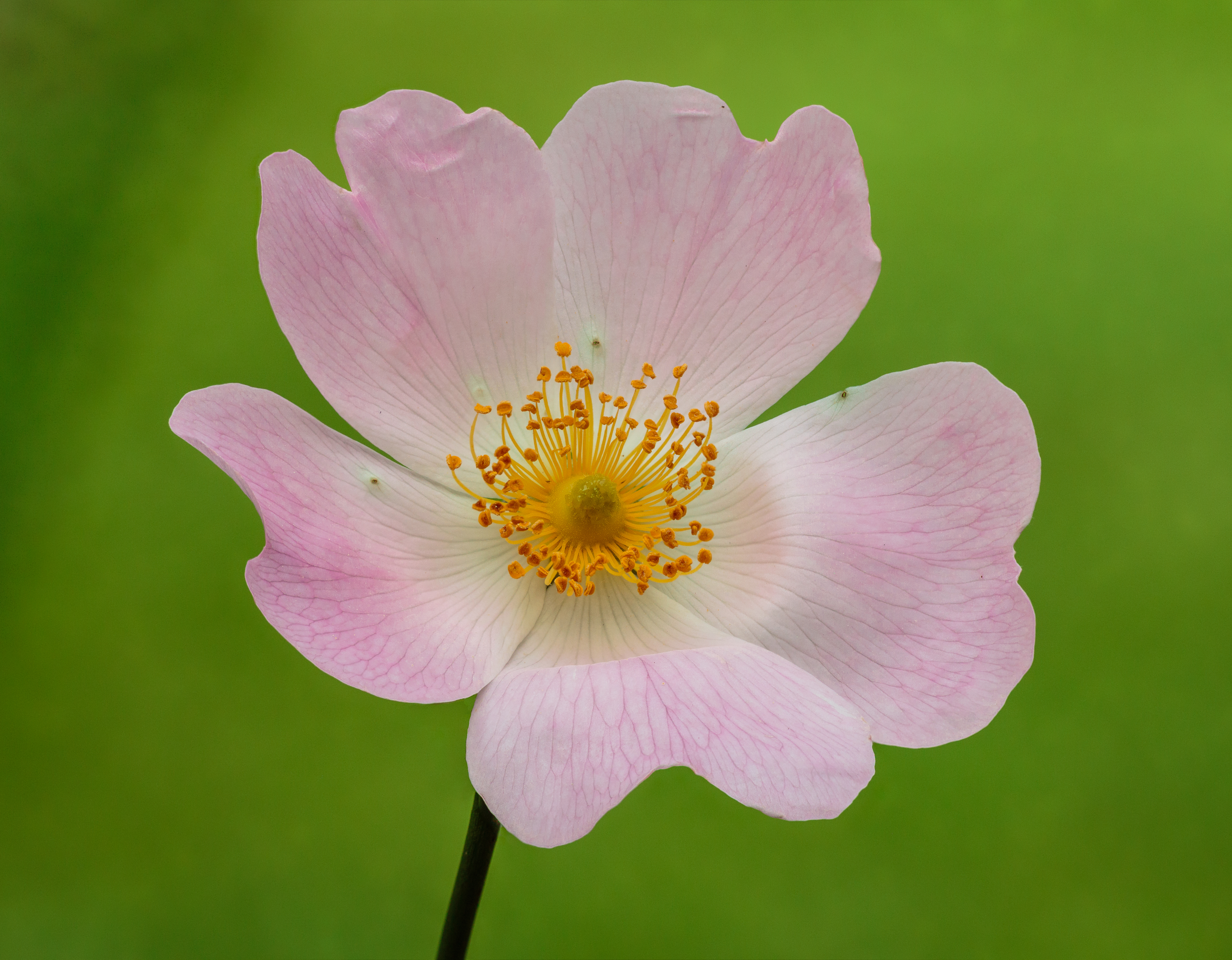
inflorescence

Fruits.

Its fruit persists for an average of 64 days, and bears an average of 18.1 seeds per fruit. Fruits average 65.2% water (possibly the lowest water content among European fleshy fruits), and their dry weight includes 17.3% carbohydrates and 0.7% lipids.

Its form and flowers can be confused with fieldbriar Rosa agrestis and sweetbriar Rosa rubiginosa.

=== Genetics ===
Dog roses have an unusual kind of meiosis which is sometimes called permanent odd polyploidy, although it can also occur with even polyploidy (e.g. in tetraploids or hexaploids). Regardless of ploidy level, only seven bivalents are formed leaving the other chromosomes as univalents. Univalents are included in egg cells, but not in pollen. Similar processes occur in some other organisms. Dog roses (Rosa sect. Caninae) are most commonly pentaploid, i.e. with five times the base number of seven chromosomes for the genus Rosa, but may be diploid, tetraploid or hexaploid as well.

== Taxonomy ==
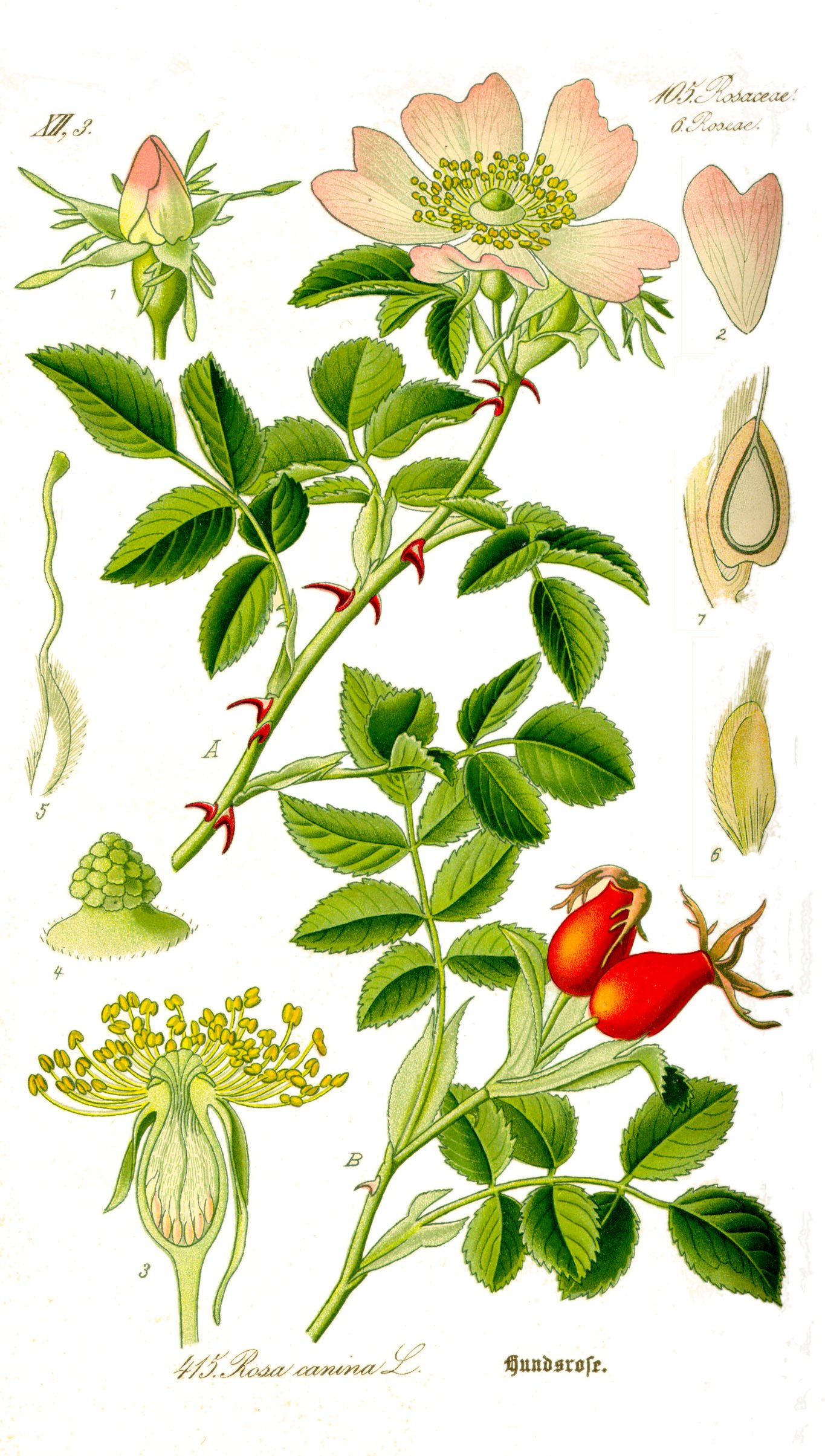
Botanical illustration by Otto Wilhelm Thomé

Classical writers did not recognise Rosa canina as a rose, but called it Cynorrhodon, from the Greek κυνόροδον. In 1538, Turner called it "Cynosbatos : wild hep or brere tree". Yet in 1551, Matthias de l'Obel classified it as a rose, under the name, "Canina Rosa odorata et silvestris", in his herbal "Rubus canis: Brere bush or hep tree" .

Based on a 2013 DNA analysis using amplified fragment length polymorphisms of wild-rose samples from a transect across Europe (900 samples from section Caninae, and 200 from other sections), it has been suggested that the following named species are best considered as belonging to a single R. canina species complex:

- R. balsamica Besser
- R. caesia Sm.
- R. corymbifera Borkh.
- R. dumalis Bechst.
- R. montana Chaix
- R. stylosa Desv.
- R. subcanina (Christ) Vuk.
- R. subcollina (Christ) Vuk.
- R. × irregularis Déségl. & Guillon

=== Etymology ===
The botanical name is derived from the common names 'dog rose' or similar in several European languages, including classical Latin and ancient (Hellenistic period) Greek. The Roman naturalist Pliny attributed the name dog rose to a belief that the plant's root could cure the bite of a mad dog. It is not clear if the dogs were rabid. According to The Oxford Dictionary of Phrase and Fable, the English name is a direct translation of the plant's name from classical Latin, rosa canina, itself a translation of the Greek κυνόροδον ('kunórodon'); It is thought to have been used to treat the bite of rabid dogs in the 18th and 19th centuries. The origin of its name may be related to the hooked prickles on the plant that have resemblance to a dog's canines. It is sometimes considered that the word 'dog' has a disparaging meaning in this context, indicating 'worthless' as compared with cultivated garden roses.

== Ecology ==
=== Pests and diseases ===
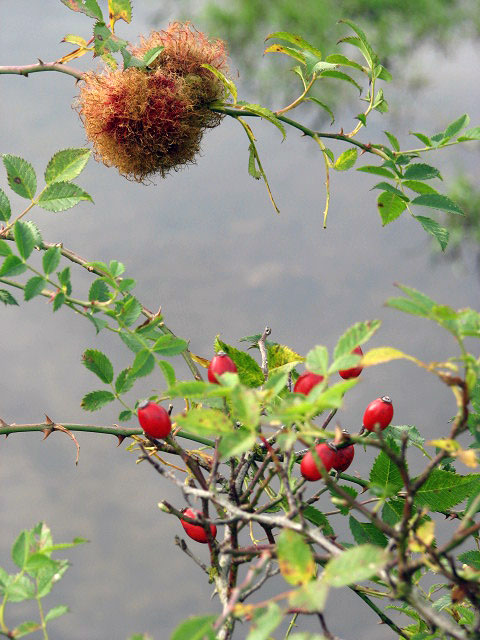
Rose bedeguar gall on a dog rose

The dog rose can be attacked by aphids, leafhoppers, glasshouse red spider mite, scale insects, caterpillars, rose leaf-rolling sawfly, and leaf-cutting bees.

When a gall wasp lays eggs into a leaf axillary or terminal bud the plant develops a chemically induced distortion known as robin's pincushion.

Buds and leaves may be eaten by rabbits and deer, despite the thorns.

It may be affected by rose rust and powdery mildews (Podosphaera pannosa), and downy mildew (Peronospora sparsa).

It is notably susceptible to honey fungus.

=== As an invasive species ===
Dog rose is an invasive species in the high country of New Zealand. It was recognised as displacing native vegetation as early as 1895 although the Department of Conservation does not consider it to be a conservation threat.

The dog rose is classified as a weed in Australia under the Natural Resources Management Act of 2004. It outcompetes native plants, offers shelter to pests like foxes and rabbits, is not eaten by livestock due to its unpalatable nature, and its large shrubs resist grazing by farm animals. The dog rose invades native bushland therefore reducing biodiversity and the presence of desirable pasture species. It is a biosecurity risk as it hosts fruit fly.

In the US, it is classified as a weed and invasive in some regions or habitats, where it may displace desirable vegetation due to its large size and ability of regeneration from sprouts. It can also impede the movement of livestock, wildlife and vehicles.

Birds and wild fruit eating animals are the main cause of seed dispersal. The plant seeds can also be carried in the hooves or fur of stock animals. They may also be carried by waterways.

== Cultivation ==
The dog rose is hardy to zone 3 in the UK (USDA hardiness zone 3–7), tolerates maritime exposure, grows well in a sunny position, and grows even in heavy clay soils, but like all roses dislikes water-logged soils or very dry sites. In deep shade, it usually fails to flower and fruit.

Numerous cultivars have been named, though few are common in cultivation. The cultivar Rosa canina 'Assisiensis' is the only dog rose without thorns. Thought to be linked to Saint Francis of Assisi, hence the name.

== Uses ==
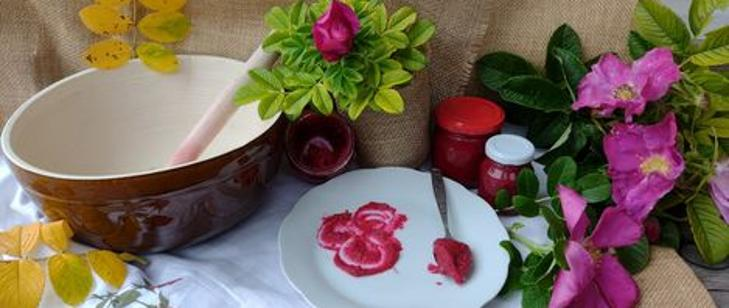
Crushing rose petals for jam

The fruits can be picked and eaten straight from the bush when ripe in autumn, if care is taken to avoid the hairs inside the fruit. They are also used to make syrup, tea, and preserves (jam and marmalade), and are used in the making of pies, stews, and wine. The flowers can be made into a syrup, eaten in salads, candied, or preserved in vinegar, honey or brandy. During World War II in the United States, Rosa canina was planted in victory gardens; it can still be found growing throughout that country, including on roadsides, in pastures and nature conservation areas.

In Poland, the petals are used to make a jam that is particularly suitable for filling pączki, a type of doughnut.

Rose hip essential oil is composed mainly of alcohols, monoterpenes and sesquiterpenes.

In Bulgaria, where the dog rose grows in abundance, its hips are used to make sweet wine and tea.

In Slovenia, its hips are made into a popular drink named Cockta.

=== Nutritional value ===
Rose hips (the pseudo-fruits of Rosa canina) are rich sources of vitamin C, which can vary widely depending on species, ripeness, and post-harvest handling. They also contain provitamin-A carotenoids, such as β-carotene and lutein, which contribute to antioxidant activity. Tocopherols (vitamin E) are also present and contribute to the fruit’s antioxidant capacity. Phenolic compounds, including flavonoids and phenolic acids, provide additional antioxidant and anti-inflammatory properties. Essential minerals are also found in both the hypanthium and the seeds.

The seeds contain an oil rich in polyunsaturated fatty acids, especially linoleic acid (35–56% of total fatty acids) and α-linolenic acid (20–30%).

The hypanthium (fruit body) contains carotenoids (β-carotene, lycopene, lutein) and phenolics (quercetin, catechin, gallic acid), which together explain much of the fruit’s antioxidant activity. Variability in subspecies, environment, harvest time, and processing means that commercial rose-hip products can differ substantially in nutrient and bioactive composition unless standardized.

== In culture ==
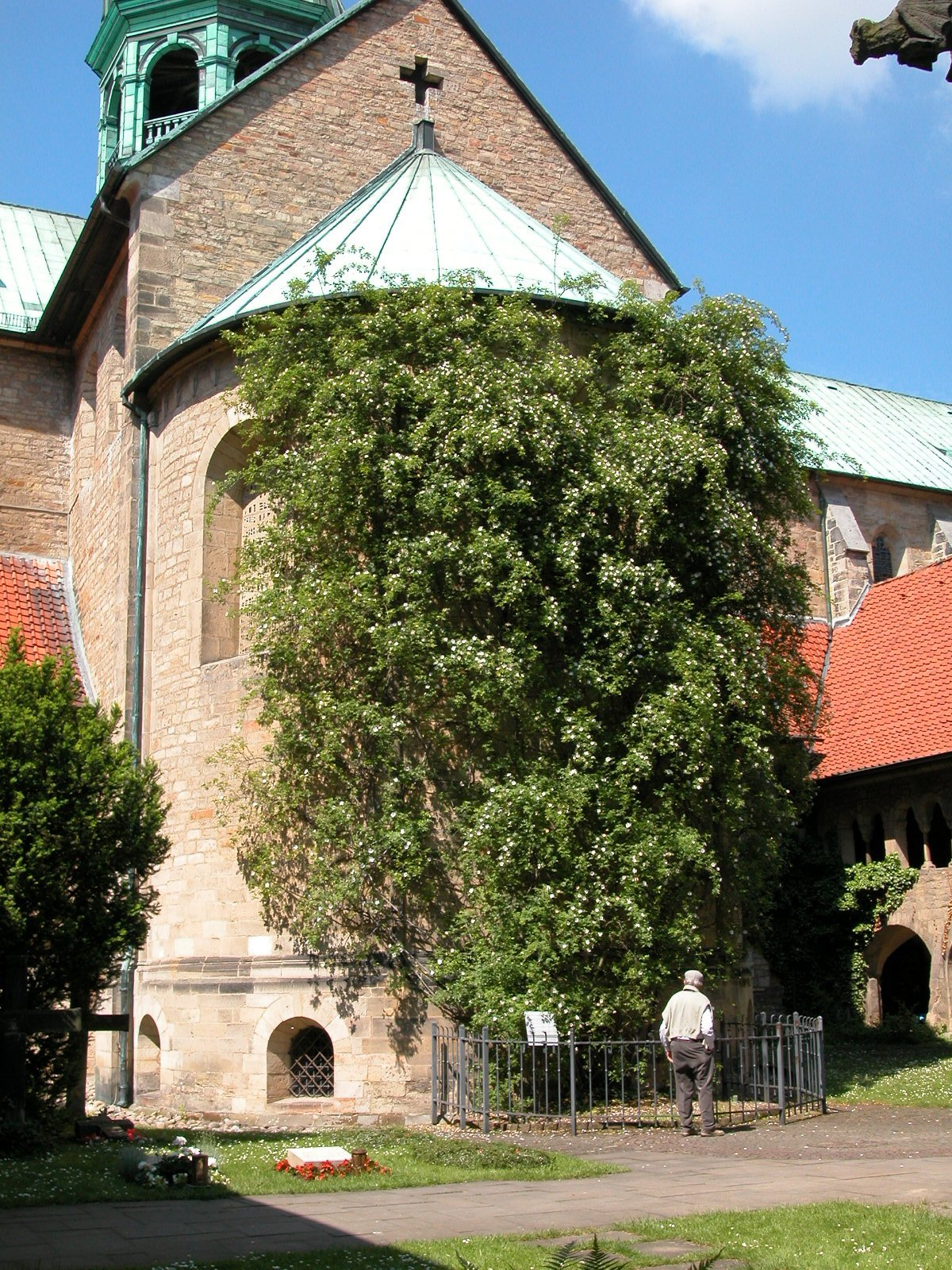
The Thousand-year Rose in Hildesheim

The dog rose was the stylised rose of medieval European heraldry. It is the county flower of Hampshire, and Ireland's County Leitrim is nicknamed "The Wild Rose County" due to the prevalence of the dog rose in the area. Legend states the Thousand-year Rose or Hildesheim Rose, which climbs against a wall of Hildesheim Cathedral, dates back to the establishment of the diocese in 815.

The first recorded significance of the flower dates back hundreds of years ago to The Academy of Floral Games (founded in 1323), which gifted poets a sprig of dog rose to reward them for their literary excellence. Due to this ritual, the branches became increasingly popular and can be found frequently mentioned in several famous poems. Most prevalent in the United Kingdom, William Shakespeare wrote about the flower in A Midsummer Night's Dream, which in his time was called eglantine, though it can now also refer to Rosa rubiginosa (Sweet brier).

Oberon, A Midsummer Night's Dream, Act II, Scene I quoting his words: "With sweet musk-roses and with eglantine."

Symbolically, the meaning of this shrub is quite extensive since the two dominating themes surrounding the flower are pain and pleasure.

An old riddle is called "The Five Brethren of the Rose":

On a summer's day, in sultry weather
Five Brethren were born together
Two had beards and two had none
And the other had but half a one.

The riddle contains an effective way of identifying the differing roses of the canina group, where the brethren refers to the five sepals of the dog-rose, two of which are whiskered on both sides, two quite smooth and the last one whiskered on one side only.

The flower has also been used as an image on many postage stamps across Europe.

== Bibliography ==
- Ehrlén, Johan; Eriksson, Ove (1991). "Phenological variation in fruit characteristics in vertebrate-dispersed plants". Oecologia. 86 (4): 463–470. Bibcode:1991Oecol..86..463E. doi:10.1007/BF00318311. ISSN 0029-8549.
