= Hisar State Reserve =

Nature reserve in Uzbekistan

Coordinates: 38°55′N 67°24′E

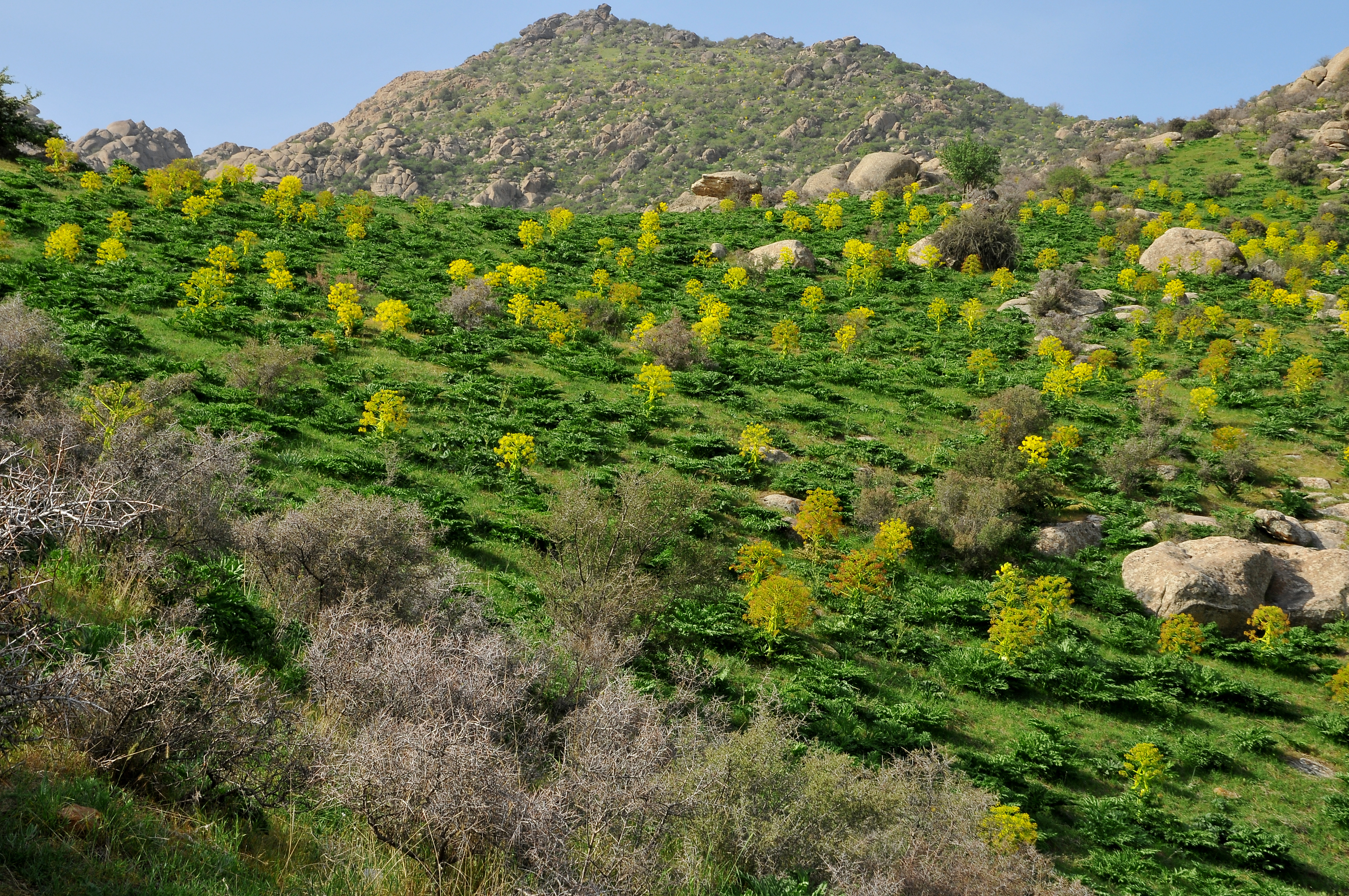
- Interactive map of Hisar State Reserve
- Location: Qashqadaryo Region, Uzbekistan
- Nearest town: Shahrisabz
- Area: 80,986.1 hectares (200,121 acres)
- Established: 9 September 1983
- Website: http://www.hisor.uz

Hisar State Reserve is located in the Kashkadarya region of Uzbekistan, west of Hisar mountain ranges (in the mountainous areas of Yakkabogʻ and Shahrisabz districts). It was established (1983) on the basis of Kyzilsuv (1975) and Miroqi (1976) nature reserves. Its area is 80,986.1 ha, of which 12,203 ha are forests, 2,745 ha are meadows, and 17 m are water bodies. It was established for the purpose of preserving natural landscape complexes and ecosystems of the Hisar mountain range. There are more than 870 plants (more than 35 medicinal plants included in the Red Book of Uzbekistan, such as hairy carrack, crooked thorn carrack, Butkov astragalus, white aconitum, Oshanin onion, anzur onion), more than 140 birds and animals (black leopard, Turkestan lynx, brown bear). There are 910 types of flora of the Hisar Nature Reserve, 250 of which are medicinal and food plants, 80 are endemic representatives of the Pamir-Aloy flora, 30 of them are rare species included in the Red Book of Uzbekistan. The fauna of Hisar Reserve includes 32 species of mammals, 215 species of birds, 19 species of reptiles and amphibians, 2 species of fish, and 950 species of invertebrates. Among these animals, 10 species of mammals, 17 species of birds, 1 species of fish and 6 species of insects are included in the Red Book of Uzbekistan, 5 species of local animals are included in the Red Book of the International Union for Conservation of Nature. Hisar Nature Reserve is known for its scenery, karst plateaus with various hollows, mountains, lakes, and waterfalls. In the territory of the reserve there are about ten natural monuments and a number of historical objects, including several places of pilgrimage such as Amir Temur cave and Khazret Sultan mountain.

== History ==
- In 1975, Kyzilsuv mountain and spruce reserve was established at the foothills of Hissaro-Alay.
- In 1976, another nature reserve - Miroqi - was established near Kyzilsuv. Its tasks included the protection of the Severtsov glacier, the largest in Uzbekistan, and the upper part of Kashkadarya, which supplies water to Shahrisabz, Kitab and Yakkabogʻ districts, as well as the Karshi desert, which is an important area for horticulture.
- On September 9, 1983, both reserves were merged into a single Hisar reserve. At that time, its area was equal to 76,889 hectares.
- As of 2020, the area of the reserve is 80,986.1 hectares. On February 18, 2020, an additional protection zone with a total area of 2000 hectares was established around the most visited natural attractions (Khazret Sultan mountains, Suvtushar waterfall, Amir Temur cave). The reserve is under the control of State Committee for Nature Protection of Uzbekistan.

== Climate ==
The territory of the Hisar State Reserve is located in one of the hottest regions of Central Asia, belonging to the dry subtropical climate zone. In the city of Shahrisabz, which is closest to the border of the reserve, the average annual temperature is +16 °C, and the maximum temperature is +50 °C. At the same time, the climate in the reserve is mountainous, and there may be significant differences in air temperature depending on the altitude of one or another area. In general, the climate of the reserve area is sharply continental, characterized by a moderately cold, rainy winter, a long rainy spring, and a very hot and dry summer.

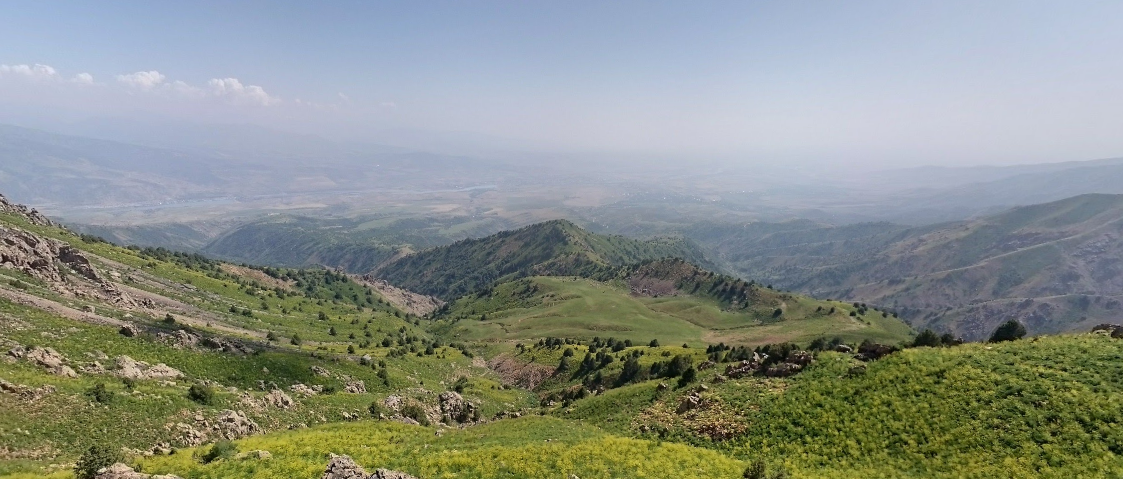
Panorama od Hisar State Reserve

In the lowest parts of the protected area, the average annual temperature is +14 °C, in winter the average monthly temperature is below 0 °C. The average temperature of July, the hottest month, is +30 °C. Temperature changes recorded in mountainous areas are -25 °C in January and + 38... + 40 °C in July, respectively. At an altitude of 1800–2400 m, the sum of the main temperatures exceeds 30-35 °C. The total duration of warm days in this region does not exceed 200 days. At an altitude of 3200–3400 m, the average annual air temperature drops below +5 °C, even in the hottest months (July, August) the average temperature does not exceed +10 °C. Here, the warm climate lasts only 50–100 days with a temperature above +5 °C. The snow line in the Hisar Reserve is 4100 m high, but in the lower parts there are sometimes small glaciers and snow piles that do not melt in summer. The average annual rainfall in Hisar Reserve ranges from 550 to 750 mm, which varies with altitude. 64 percent of this indicator corresponds to the cold days of the year. Winter lasts 2–2.5 months in the lowlands, and much longer in the highlands. During the warm season, most of the precipitation in the lower mountain belt falls on relatively low temperature months, and from May to September there is almost no rain here. In mountainous areas, it rains from time to time in summer. The natural location of the mountainous terrain causes the appearance of local winds. These winds change their direction depending on the time of day. At night, the wind blows from the mountains towards the valleys, and during the day, the air mass blows towards the valley slopes.

== Geography ==
Hisar State Reserve is located in the Kashkadarya region of the Republic of Uzbekistan. Its northern parts are adjacent to the state border between Uzbekistan and Tajikistan, and the south and southeast parts are connected to Kashkadarya and Surkhandarya regions. The eastern boundary of the reserve is not included in the territory of the reserve. The western part of the reserve does not have a clearly defined border. Hisar reserve consists of four separate areas - Gilon, Mirakin, Tankhazdar'in and Qizilsuv. All of them are distributed among three districts of the region: Shahrisabz (50,892 ha), Yakkabogʻ (16,002.1 ha) and Qamashi (14,092 ha) districts. There are 13 settlements with a population of 30,000 directly adjacent to the borders of the reserve. Also, the administration of the environmental protection institution is located in the city of Shahrisabz. The Hisar reserve is located on the border of the Western Pamir-Alay and Hisar-Alay mountain ranges and covers the western slopes of the Hisar range. The protected area is 90 km from north to south and 37 km from west to east. All protected areas are located at an altitude of 1,750 m to 4,421 m, the mountain peaks in the reserve are not lower than 2,500 m on average. The highest point of the protected zone is an unnamed peak located in the Tortkuyliq mountain range. In addition, Khojakarshavar (4304 m) and Khazret Sultan (4266 m) mountains are distinguished by their significant height. The peculiarity of this region is that it is directly influenced by moist air coming from the Northern Pamir-Alay and dry air masses coming from the Turanian deserts.

== Gallery ==
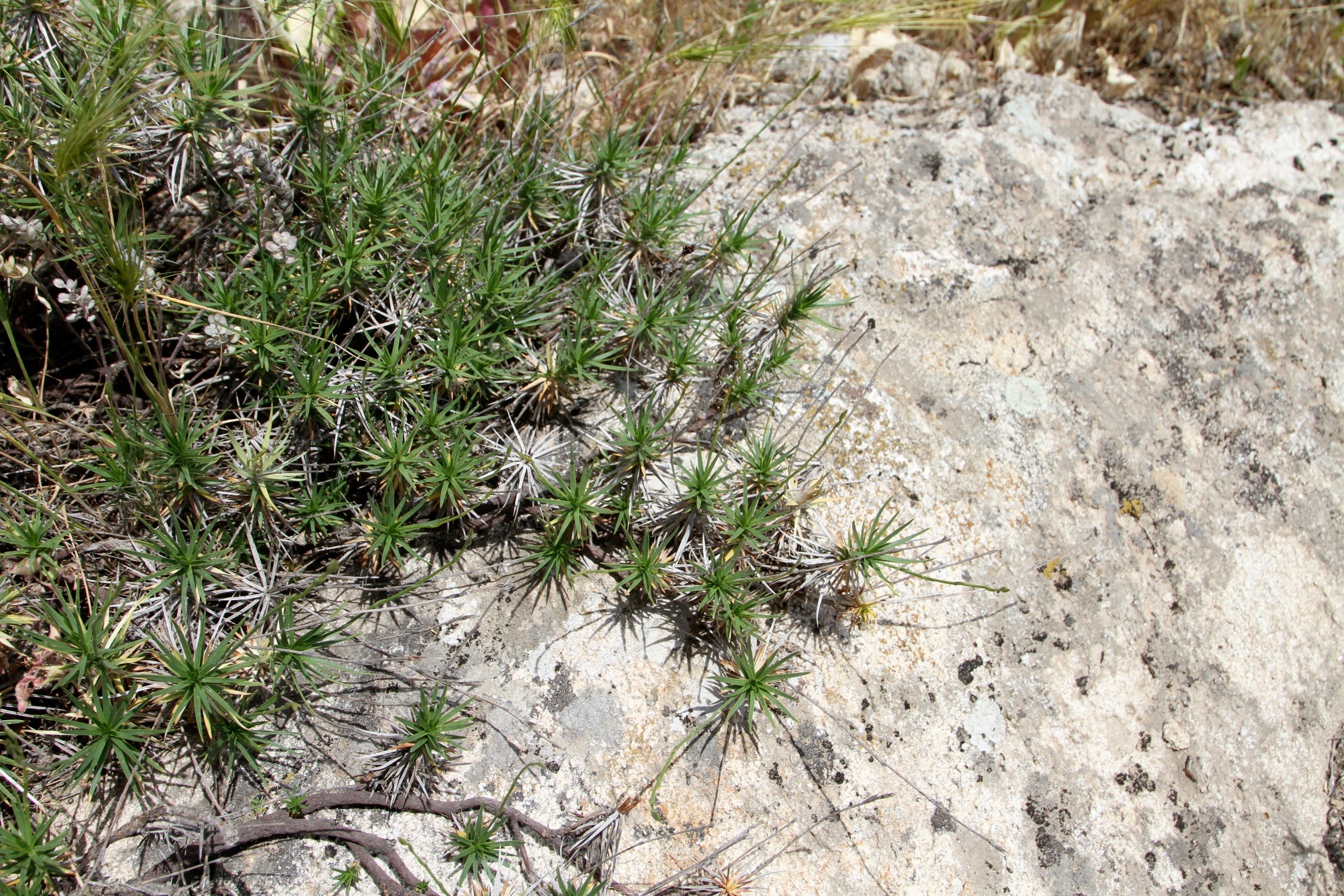
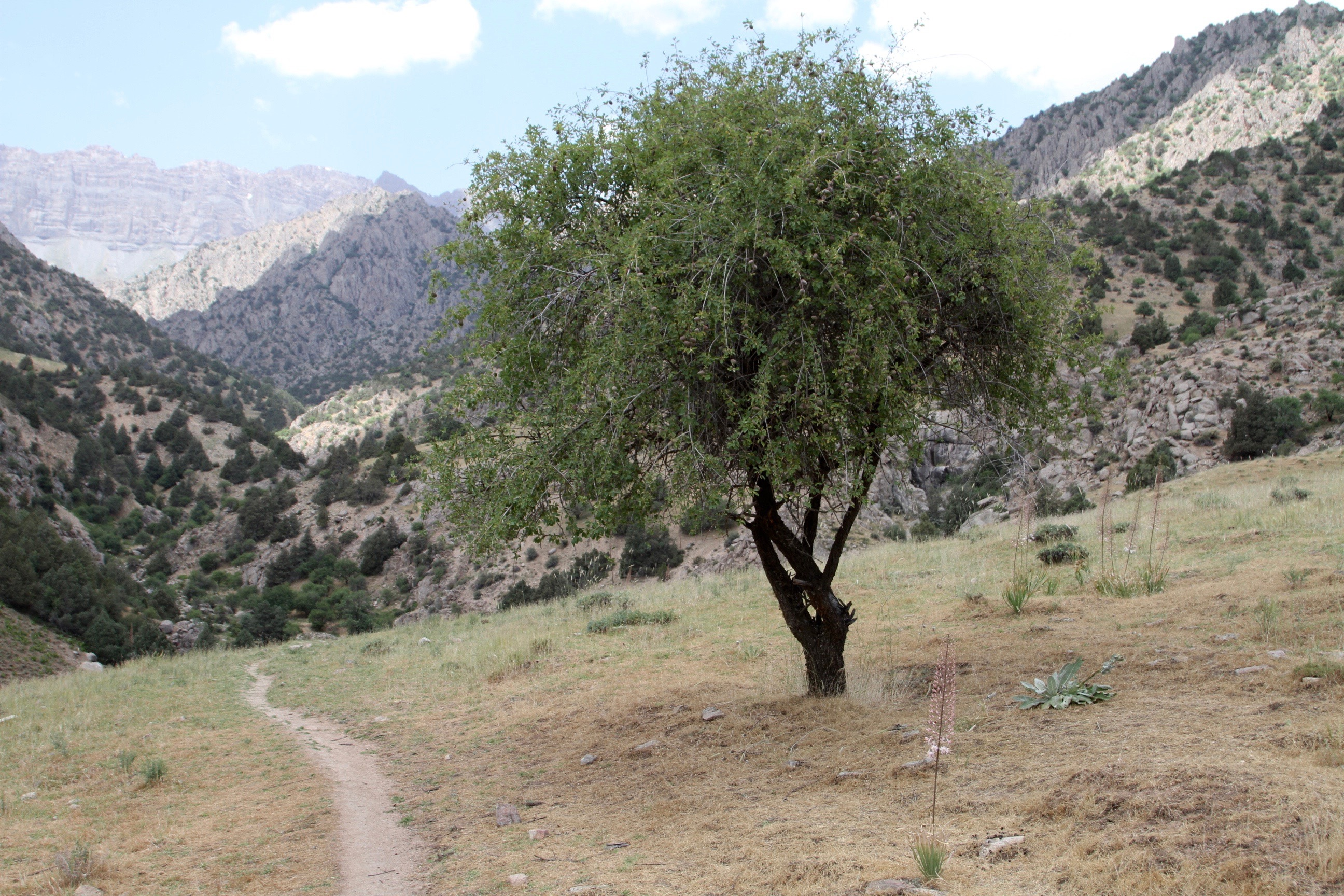
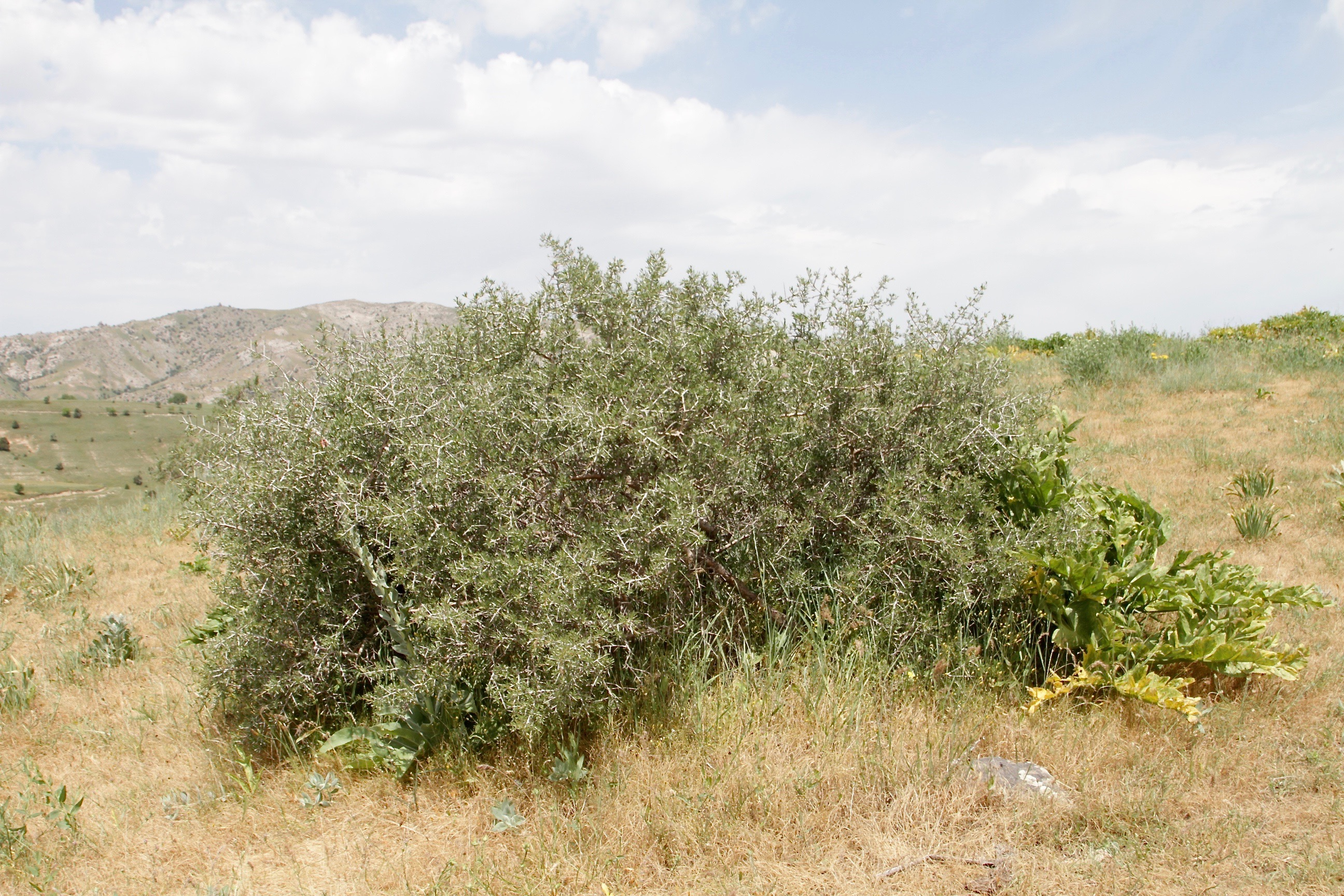
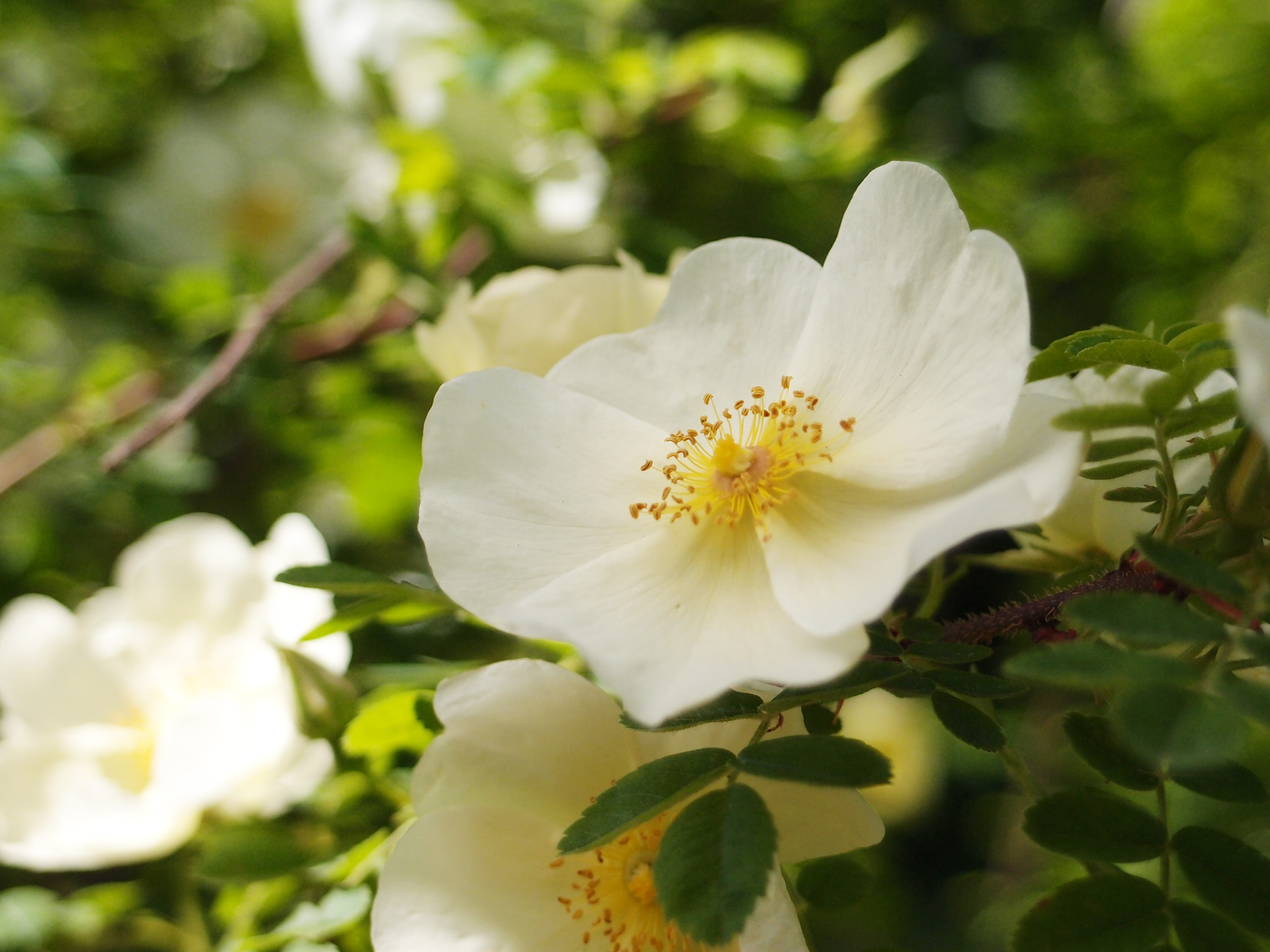
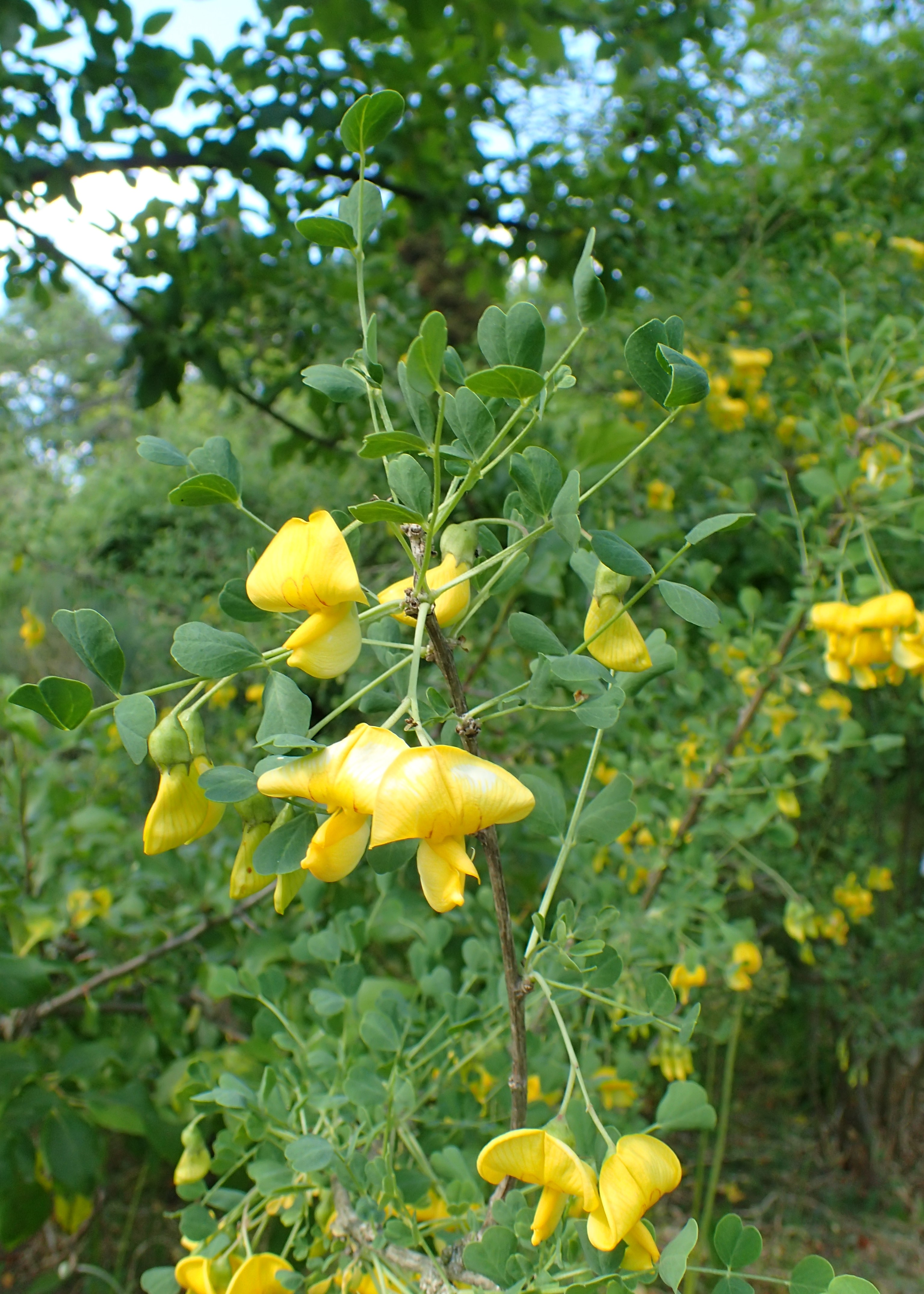
| центр | центр | центр | центр | центр |
| Acantholimon saravschanicum. | Amygdalus bucharica. | Amygdalus spinosissima. | Rosa ecae. | Colutea paulsenii. |

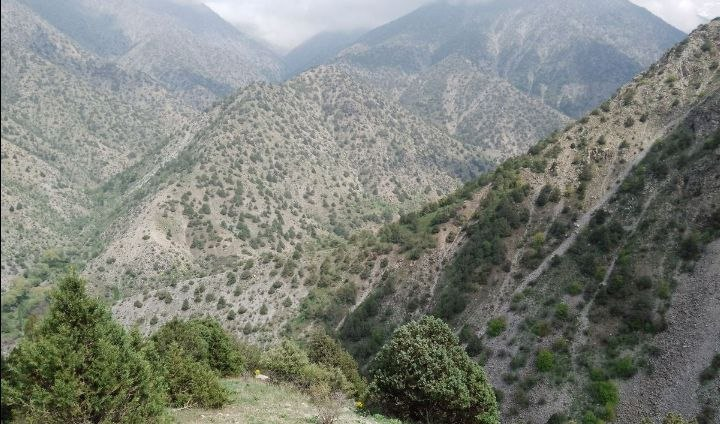
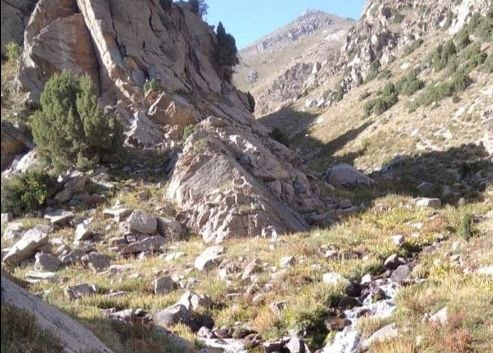
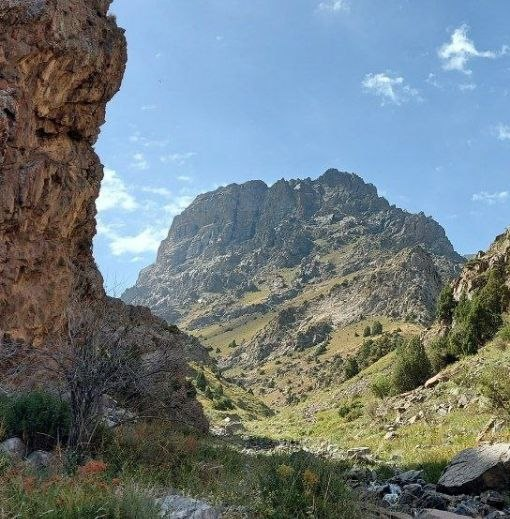
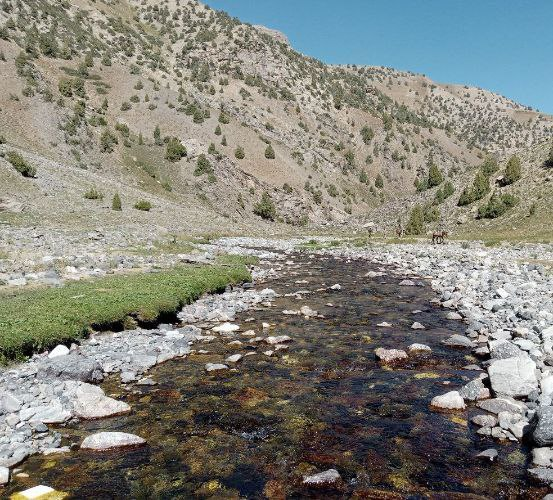
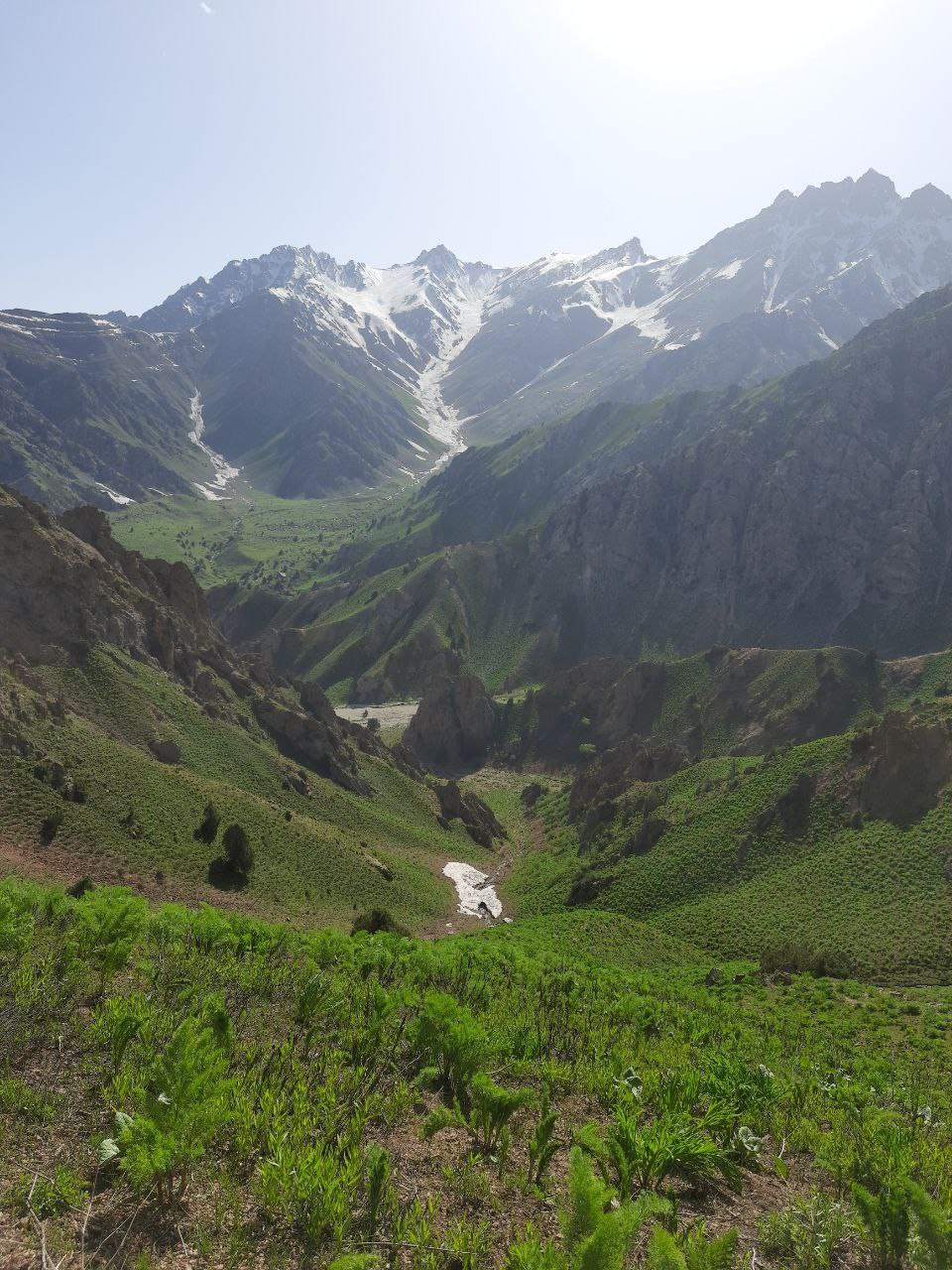
| центр | центр | центр | центр | центр |
| Hisar State Reserve. | Hisar State Reserve. | Hisar State Reserve. | A tributary in Hisar State Reserve. | Hisar State Reserve. |
