= Yellow rose =

Yellow rose may refer to:

== Botany ==
- A yellow rose in general
- Rosa 'Harison's Yellow' or The Yellow Rose of Texas, a rose cultivar
- Various rose species with yellow flowers, including:
  - Rosa banksiae or Banks' rose
  - Rosa foetida or Persian yellow rose
  - Rosa hemisphaerica or sulphur rose
  - Rosa persica
  - Rosa xanthina or Manchu rose

== Other uses ==
- The Yellow Rose, an American TV series, 1983–1984
  - "The Yellow Rose" (song), its 1984 theme song, recorded by Johnny Lee and Lane Brody
- The Yellow Rose (film), a 1982 Romanian film
- Yellow Roses (Hank Snow song), 1955
- Yellow Roses (Dolly Parton song), 1989
- Yellow Rose (society), a Swedish Masonic adoption lodge, 1802–1803
- Yellow Rose (1941 film), a Hungarian drama film
- Yellow Rose (2019 film), a musical film directed by Diane Paragas

== See also ==
- The Yellow Rose of Texas (disambiguation)
- "Who Made Yellow Roses Yellow?", 1959 short story by novelist John Updike
- 18 Yellow Roses, 1963 album by American singer Bobby Darin
