= Black Rose =

Black Rose or Black Roses may refer to:

== Literature ==
- Black Rose (magazine), an anarchist magazine published in Boston during the 1970s and 1980s
- The Black Rose (novel), a 1945 historical novel by Thomas B. Costain
- Black Roses (novel), a 1929 novel by Francis Brett Young
- Black Rose Books, a Montréal publishing house primarily known for its anarchist titles

=== Characters ===
- Black Rose (.hack), a fictional character from the .hack media franchise
- Kodachi Kuno ("The Black Rose"), a character in Rumiko Takahashi's Ranma 1/2 media franchise
- Black Rose, an incarnation of Roxanne Simpson in Ghost Rider comic books
- Lord Soth (Knight of the Black Rose), a character in the Dragonlance and Ravenloft novels and campaign settings

== Film and TV ==
- Black Rose (2014 film), a 2014 action film
- Black Rose (2018 film), a 2018 Nigerian drama film
- The Black Rose, a 1950 adaptation of the 1945 novel, starring Orson Welles
- The Black Rose (1965 film), a 1965 Hong Kong film
- Black Roses (1921 film), a 1921 American crime drama film
- Black Roses (1932 film), a Swedish drama film
- Black Roses (1935 film), a 1935 German historical drama film
- Black Roses (1945 film), a 1945 Swedish drama film
- Black Roses (1988 film), a 1988 horror film
- Black Rose Mansion, a 1969 Japanese film also known as Black Rose

=== Television ===
- Black Rose (Singaporean TV series), a Singaporean television variety show that aired on MediaCorp Channel 8 in 2010 and again in 2014
- Black Rose (Turkish TV series), a 2013–2016 Turkish drama television series that aired on Fox Turkey

== Music ==
=== Classical ===
- "Black Roses", song by Delius
- "Black Roses", song by Sibelius

=== Musical ensembles ===
- Black Rose (British band), an English heavy metal band
- Black Rose (Fiji group), otherwise known as Rosiloa
- Black Rose, a Danish rock band featuring King Diamond

=== Albums ===
- Black Rose (Black Rose album), 1980
- Black Rose (J. D. Souther album), 1976
- Black Rose (Tyrese album), 2015
- Black Rose: A Rock Legend, a 1979 album by Thin Lizzy
- The Black Rose EP, a 2007 EP by Blindside
- Black Roses (The Rasmus album), 2008
- Black Roses, an unreleased album by Foxy Brown

=== Songs ===
- "Black Rose", by Borealis from the album World of Silence
- "Black Roses", by Clare Bowen from the soundtrack The Music of Nashville: Season 2, Volume 2
- "Black Rose", by Buffalocomotive from the album Tears of the Enchanted Mainframe
- "Black Rose", by John Cale from the album Artificial Intelligence
- "Black Roses", by Charli XCX from the album True Romance
- "Black Roses", by Clear Light from the album Clear Light
- "Grim Heart/Black Rose", by Converge from the album No Heroes
- "Black Roses", by Inner Circle
- "Black Roses", by Barrington Levy
- "Black Rose", by Billy Joe Shaver, sung by Waylon Jennings, from the album Honky Tonk Heroes
- "A Black Rose", by Therion, from the album Symphony Masses: Ho Drakon Ho Megas
- "Black Rose", by Trapt from the album Only Through the Pain
- "Black Roses", by Trey Songz from the album Ready
- "Black Rose" (Volbeat song) from the album "Seal the Deal & Let's Boogie"

== Other ==
- Black rose (symbolism), a rose with black petals
- Black Rose (organization), a BDSM organization headquartered in Washington, DC
- Black rose (grape), a grape cultivar
- Black Rose (pinball), a pinball machine produced by Midway
- Black Rose (wrestler) (born 1981), Puerto Rican wrestler
- Black Roses FC

== See also ==
- Blue Rose (disambiguation)
- Red rose (disambiguation)
- White Rose (disambiguation)
- Yellow rose (disambiguation)
