= Shahrisabz District =

Coordinates: 39°01′54″N 67°14′14″E

- District
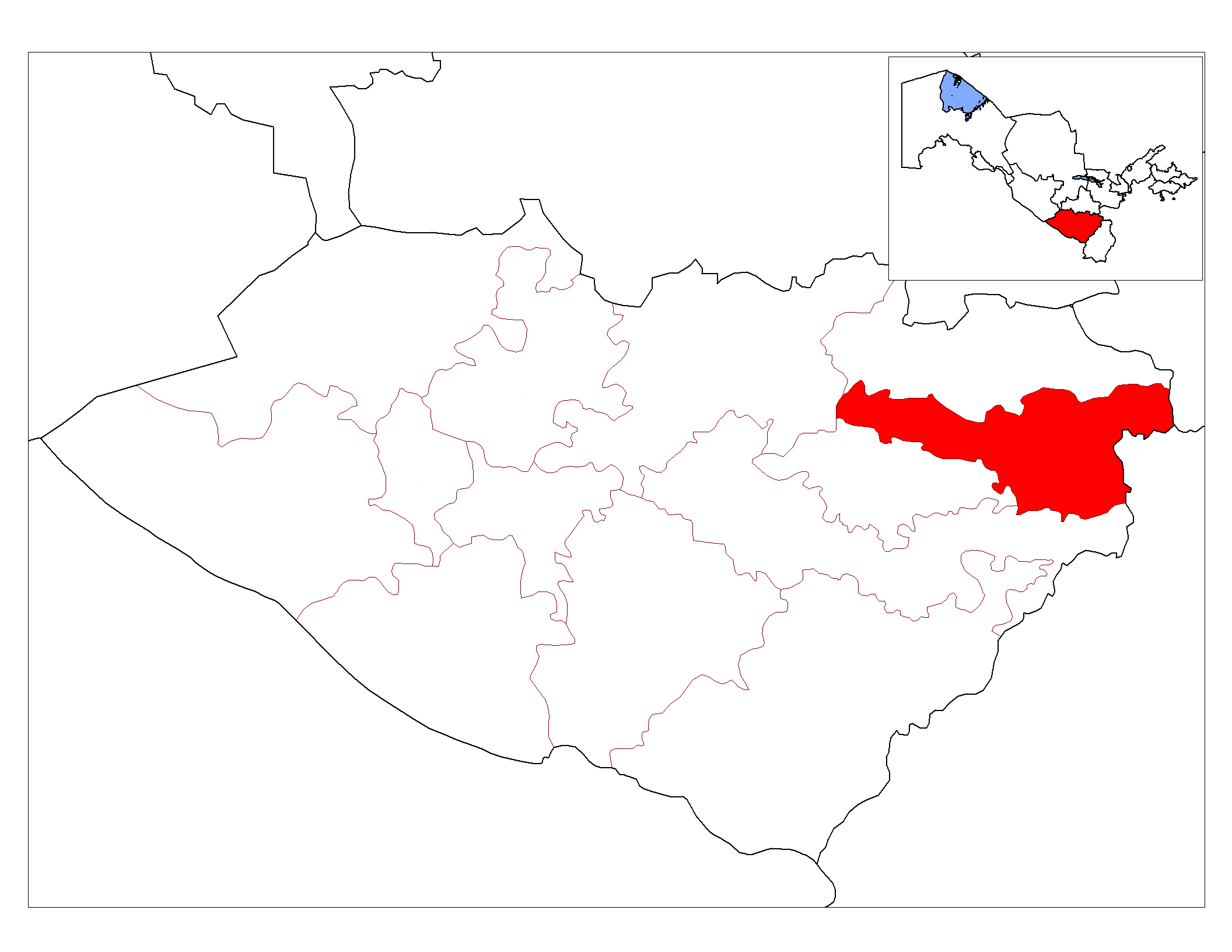
- Country: Uzbekistan
- Region: Qashqadaryo Region
- Capital: Shahrisabz

Area
  - Total: 1,620 km^{2} (630 sq mi)

Population (2021)
  - Total: 223,800
  - Density: 138/km^{2} (358/sq mi)
- Time zone: UTC+5 (UZT)

Shahrisabz District (Uzbek: Shahrisabz tumani) is a district of Qashqadaryo Region in Uzbekistan. The capital lies at the city Shahrisabz, itself not part of the district. It has an area of 1,620 km^{2} (630 sq mi) and its population is 223,800 (2021 est.). The district consists of 13 urban-type settlements (Miroqi, Qumqishloq, Oʻrtaqoʻrgʻon, Chorshanbe, Temirchi, Yangiqishloq, Qutchi, Shamaton, Ammogʻon-1, Qoʻshqanot, Anday, Xoʻjaxuroson, Keldihayot) and 12 rural communities.

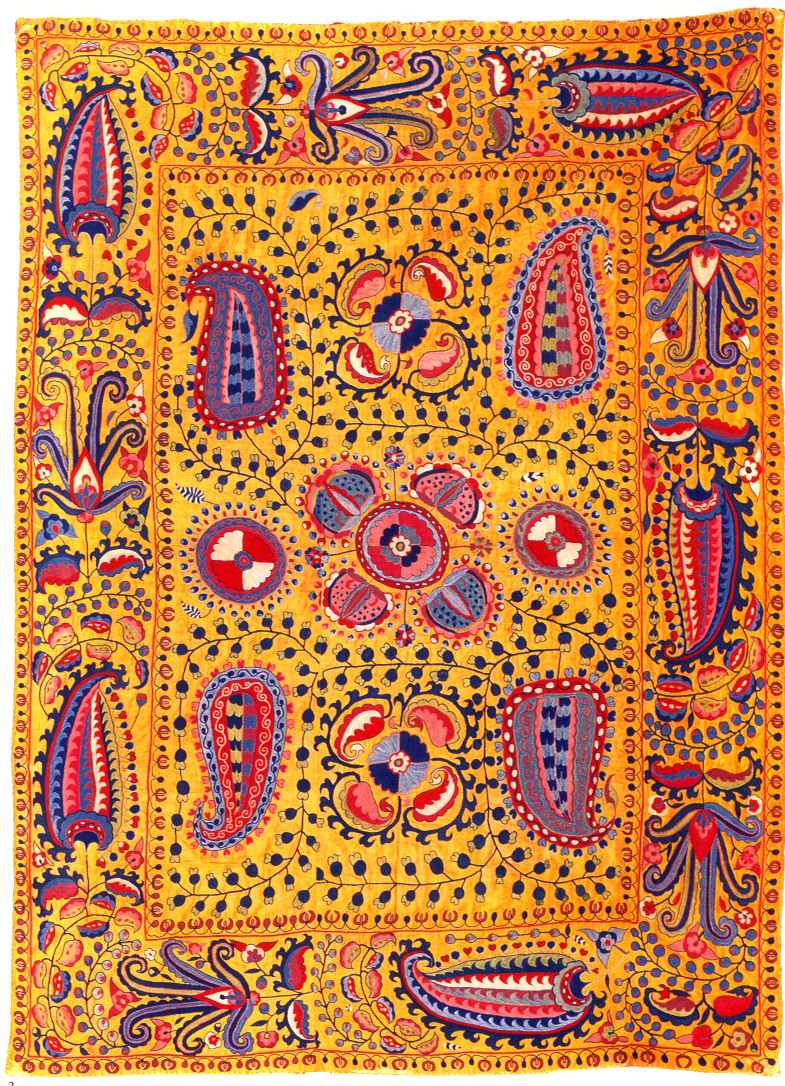
Lakai suzani from Shakhrisabz District, mid-19th century.

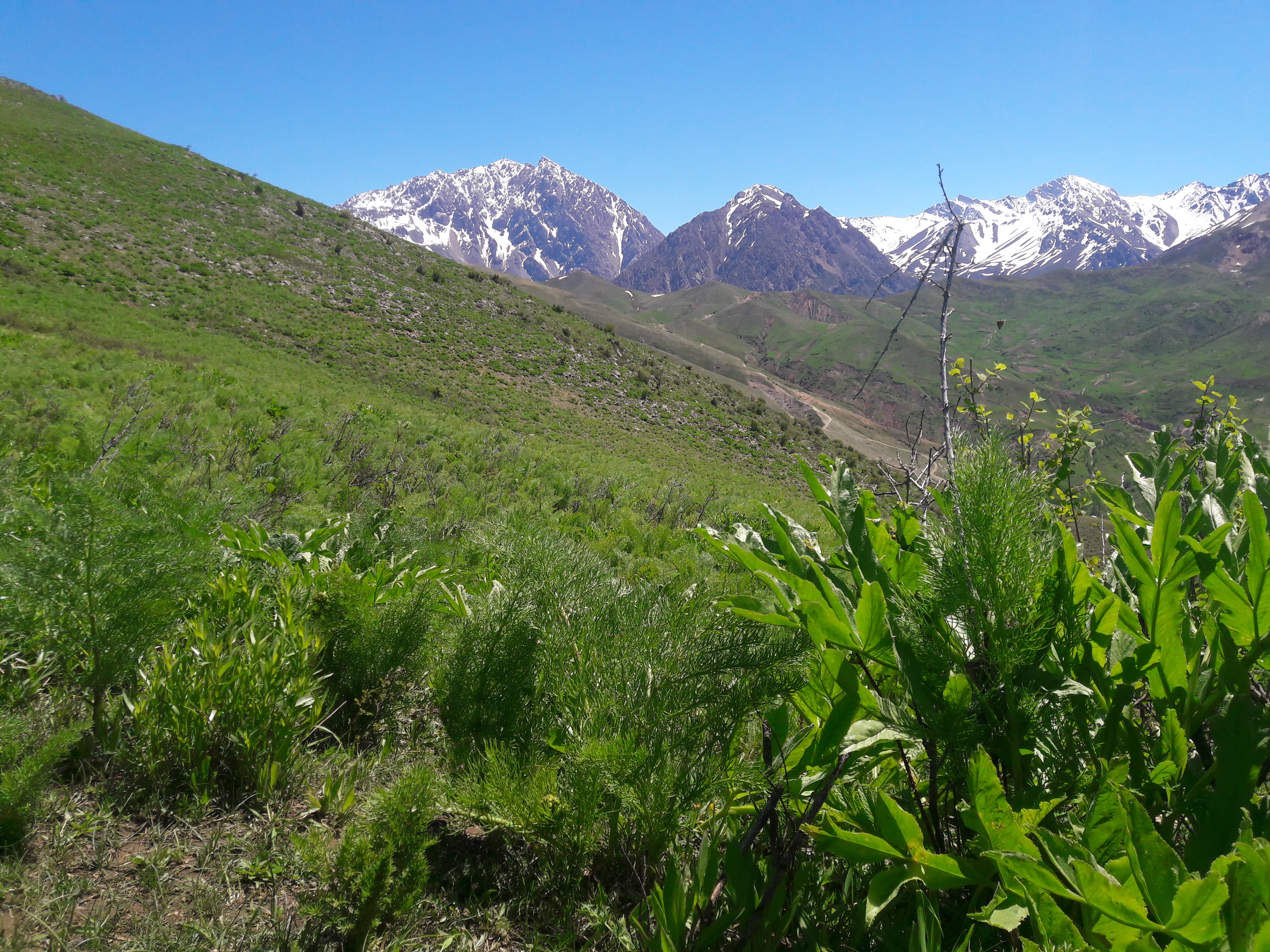
Landscape of mountain regions of Shahrisabz district, Kashkadarya region

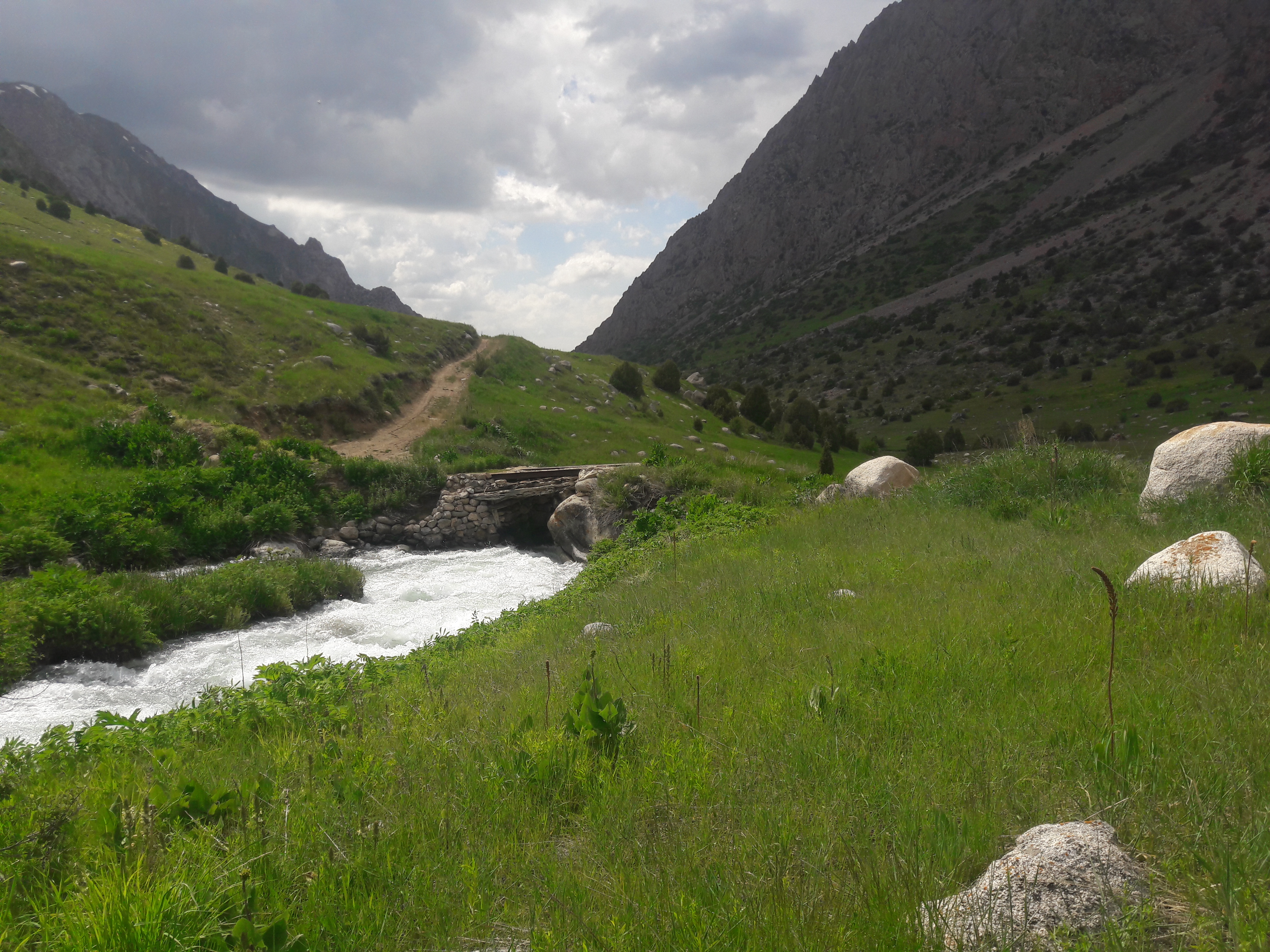
Landscape of mountain regions of Shahrisabz district, Kashkadarya region, Uzbekistan

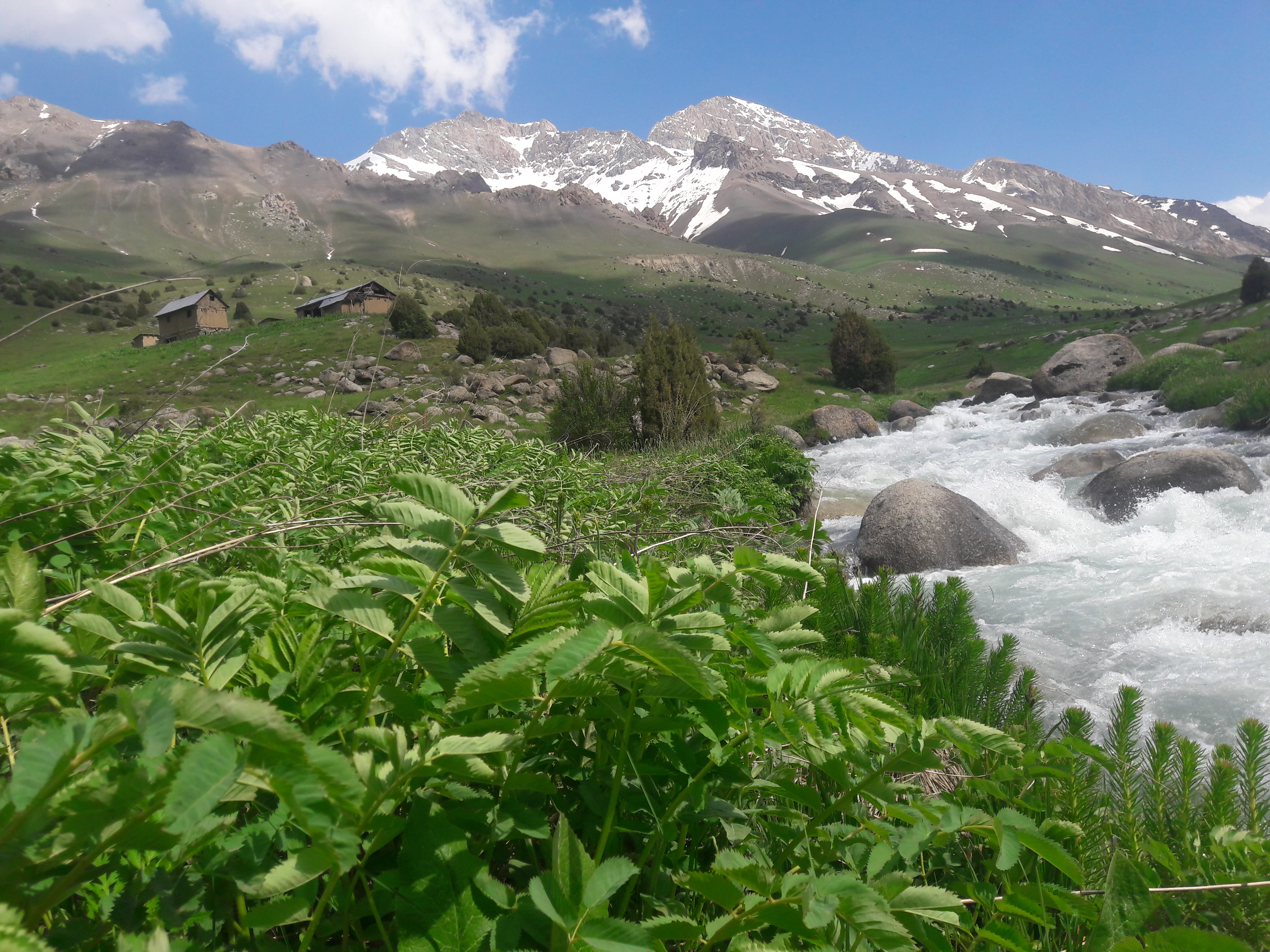
Shahrisabz district, Kashkadarya region
