= Red rose =

Red rose may refer to:

== Culture ==
- Rose (symbolism) § Socialism and social democracy, an anti-authoritarian, socialist and social democratic symbol
- The Rose Cross, a symbol of Rosicrucianism often features a red rose

== Places ==
- Red Roses, Welsh village
- Red Rose, Manitoba, a designated place in the Canadian province of Manitoba

== Plants ==
- Red Rose of Lancaster, county flower of Lancashire
- Rosa gallica
- Rose, the flower

== Film and television ==
- Red Rose (1980 film), a Hindi film starring Rajesh Khanna
- Red Rose (2014 film), a French-Iranian film
- The Red Rose (1951 film), a French comedy film
- The Red Rose (1960 film), a Spanish film
- Red Roses (film), a 1940 Italian comedy film
- "Red Rose" (Sons of Anarchy), a television episode
- Red Rose (TV series), a British horror series

== Music ==
- Red Rose (album), a 2000 album by Elva Hsiao
- "Red Rose" (song), a 1987 song by Alphaville
- "Red Roses" (song), a song by Lil Skies
- "Red Rose", a song by The Gaylads

== Other uses ==
- Red Rose Tea, a beverage
- Red Rose (missile)
- The Red Roses, the nickname of the England women's national rugby union team
- Red Rose, emblem of the men's England national rugby union team
- Red Rose, emblem of Lancashire County Cricket Club

== See also ==
- Black Rose (disambiguation)
- Red Rose Radio, the former name of a radio station in Preston, Lancashire, England
- Rose (disambiguation)
- Rose Red (disambiguation)
- Sigappu Rojakkal, a 1978 Indian Tamil-language film, literally Red Rose
