= Rose Red =

Rose Red may refer to:

- Rose Red (Fables), a character in the comic series Fables
- Rose Red (miniseries), a 2002 television miniseries
- Rose-Red, a character in the fairy tale "Snow-White and Rose-Red"
- Klara Prast, a.k.a. Rose Red, a fictional superhero appearing in Marvel comic books

== See also ==
- "Rose Red and the White Lily", a ballad
- Red rose (disambiguation)
