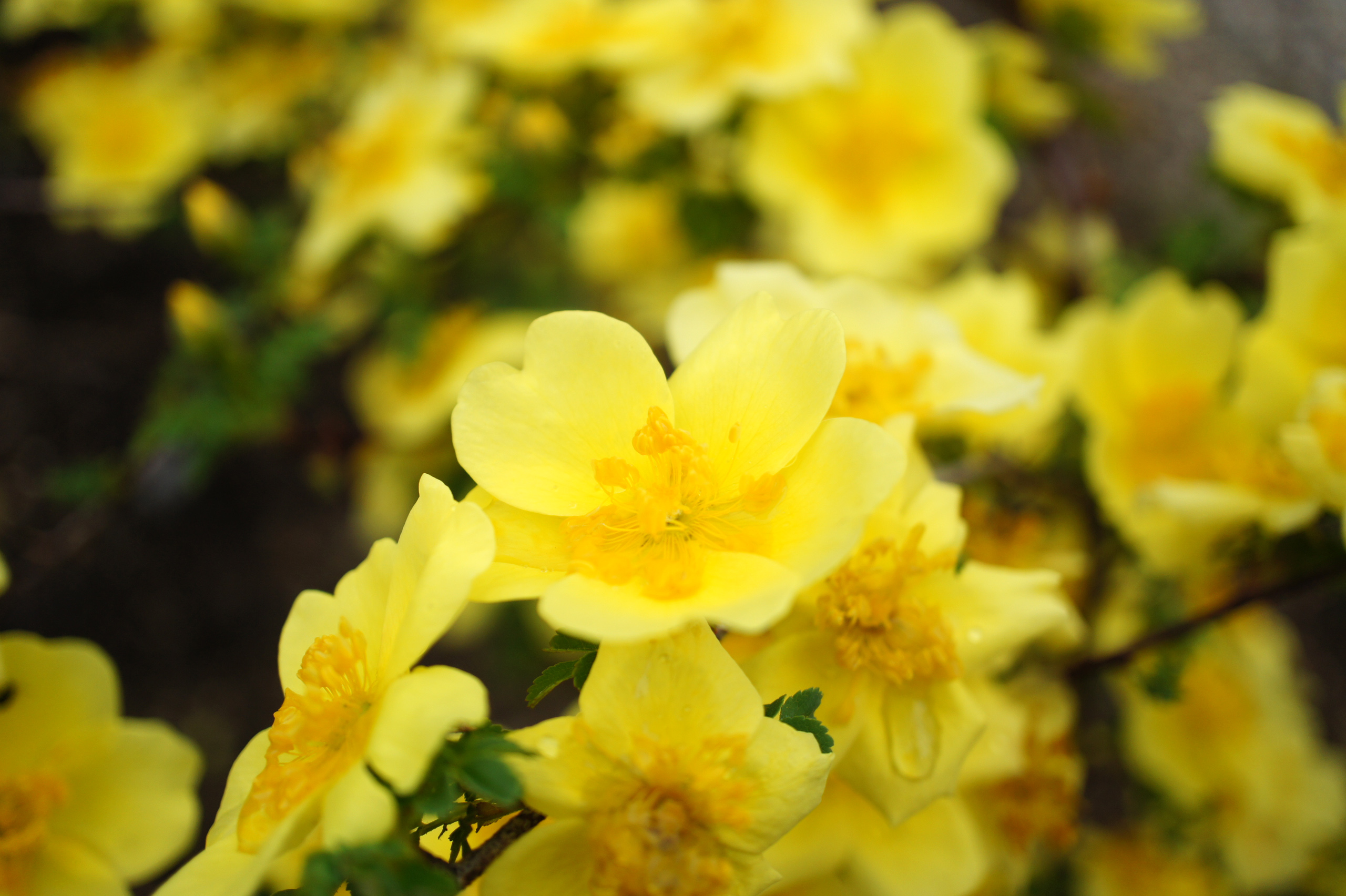
- 'Helen Knight' hybrid rose
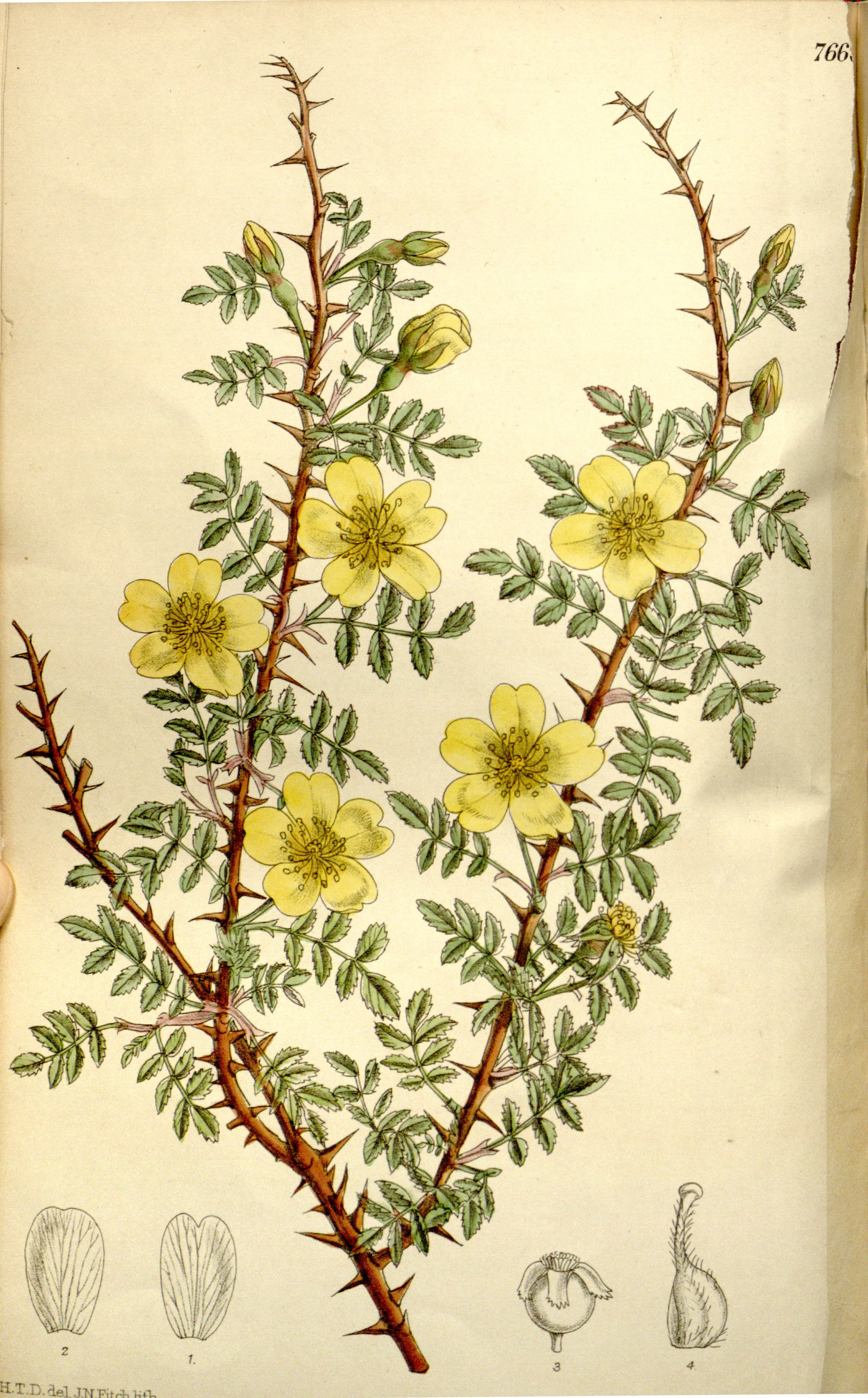
- Botanical illustration

Scientific classification
- Kingdom: Plantae
- Clade: Tracheophytes
- Clade: Angiosperms
- Clade: Eudicots
- Clade: Rosids
- Order: Rosales
- Family: Rosaceae
- Genus: Rosa
- Species: R. ecae

Binomial name
- Rosa ecae Aitch.

Synonyms
- Rosa ecae var. plena Kochk.; Rosa ecae var. pubescens Kochk.; Rosa mogoltavica Juz.; Rosa xanthina Hook.f.; Rosa xanthina var. ecae (Aitch.) Boulenger

= Rosa ecae =

Species of plant in the rose family

Rosa ecae is a species of flowering plant in the family Rosaceae, native to Central Asia (except Kazakhstan), Afghanistan, Pakistan, and the western Himalayas. A shrub reaching 120 cm (4 ft), it is very similar to Rosa xanthina. It is a probable parent of the hybrids 'Golden Chersonese' and 'Helen Knight'.
