= The Yellow Rose of Texas =

The Yellow Rose of Texas may refer to:

- "The Yellow Rose of Texas" (song), a traditional folk song
- The Yellow Rose of Texas (film), a 1944 American film directed by Joseph Kane
- The Yellow Rose of Texas (legend) inspired by the activities of Emily D. West in the Texas Revolution
- The Yellow Rose of Texas (flower), or Rosa 'Harison's Yellow', a hybrid rose cultivar
- Yellow Rose of Texas (box set), a 1993 box set by Ernest Tubb
- Yellow Rose of Texas Award
- Amarillo, Texas
- David Von Erich (1958–1984), American professional wrestler
