= Miroqi =

- urban-type settlement
- Location in Uzbekistan
- Coordinates: 39°02′00″N 67°07′25″E
- Country: Uzbekistan
- Region: Qashqadaryo Region
- District: Shakhrisabz District
- Urban-type settlement status: 1986

Population (2002)
  - Total: 7,900
- Time zone: UTC+5 (UZT)

Miroqi (Uzbek: Miroqi / Мироқи or Miraki / Мираки, Russian: Мираки) is an urban-type settlement in Qashqadaryo Region, Uzbekistan. It is part of Shakhrisabz District. The town population in 1989 was 6421 people.
