= Hissaro-Alay =

Mountain system in Central Asia

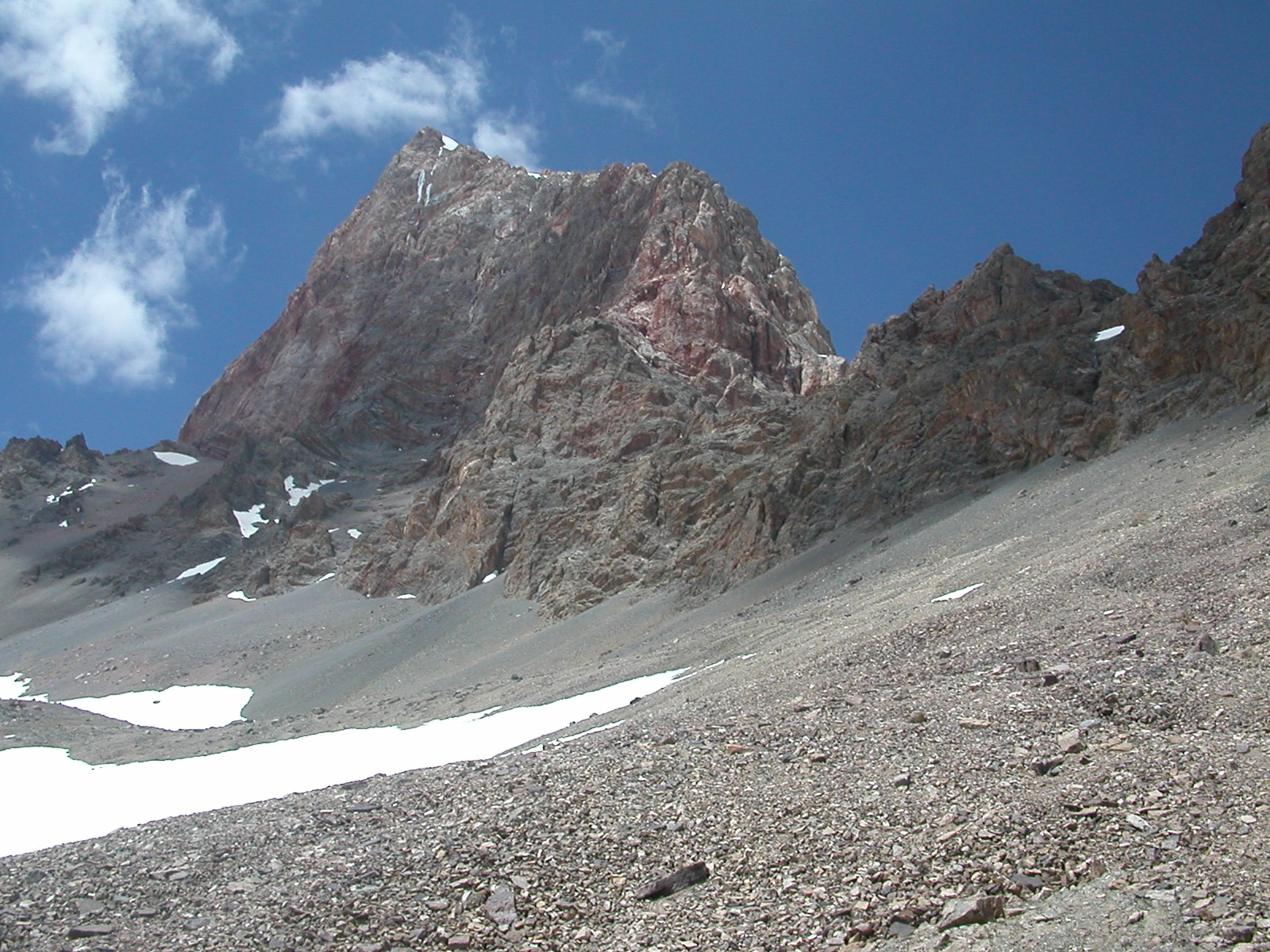
- Chimtarga peak

Highest point
- Peak: Chimtarga
- Elevation: 5,489 m (18,009 ft)

Dimensions
- Length: 900 km (560 mi)
- Width: 80–150 km (50–93 mi)

Naming
- Native name: Ҳисору-Олой (Tajik); Ысар-Алай (Kyrgyz); Hisor-Olay (Uzbek)

Geography
- Countries: Tajikistan, Uzbekistan and Kyrgyzstan
- Range coordinates: 39°28′0″N 69°58′0″E

Hissaro-Alay is a mountain system in Central Asia, part of the Pamir-Alay.

== Location ==
Hissaro-Alay is located west of the Pamirs, between the Fergana Valley in the north, the Karshi Steppe, the Tajik Depression and the Alay Valley in the south. The eastern part of the system is located on the territory of Kyrgyzstan, the middle - in Tajikistan and the western - in Uzbekistan. The length of Hissaro-Alai from west to east is about 900 km (560 mi), the width in the western part is up to 150 km (93 mi), and in the east up to 80 km (50 mi).

== History ==
Neolithic cultures, such as Hissar have inhabited the Hissaro-Alay mountain area between 6-2 millennia BCE whose economy consisted of sheep and goat pastoralism.

== Ridges ==
Name	Max. height (meters above sea level)	Length (km)	Glacier area (km^{2})
Turkestan Range	5621	340	600
Hisar (Gissar) Range	4643	200	390
Zarafshan Range	5489	397	307
Rashton (Karatekinsky) Range	3950	90	60
Malguzar Range	2621	25	0
Hobduntau Range	1672	25	0
Aktau (Nuratau Mountains	500	15	0
Karatau Mountains	1108	50	0
Nuratau Range	2165	170	0
Etaktau Range	1993	87	0
Karakchitau Mountains	1103	22	0
Koitas Mountains	1905	52	0
Natrantoo Range	3375	35	0
Terektau Range	4454	80	0
Baisuntau Range	4424	150	0
Köýtendag Range (Kugitangtau Range)	3137	41	0
Alay Range	5539	400	811
