= Rosiloa =

- Also known as: Black Rose
- Origin: Fiji
- Genres: World Music; Reggae; Pop; Country; Dance/Electronica; Folk/ContemporaryFolk; Hip-Hop
- Years active: 1995–present
- Label: Mangrove Productions

Rosiloa (previously known as Black Rose) is a Fijian music band, currently signed by the New-Caledonian music label Mangrove Productions. Many of the members are multi-instrumentalists and have more than one role in the band. In a press conference in Honiara in the Solomon Islands, lead vocalist Jim Ratusila said that the name Black Rose was suggested to him by members of South African reggae band O'Yaba when they toured Fiji in 1994; the "Black Rose" in question being Africa, and that "black people are special." The name "Rosiloa" is a translation of "Black Rose" into Fijian.

== Career ==
The band first formed in 1992, releasing several cover albums locally, starting in 1995. Co-founders Jim Ratusila and Peter Chong met in Delainavesi, Rewa Province during band practice for church services. They spoke about music with each other and found out they were related. This brought them closer together.

They released their first original album, Voices of Nature, in 2000 including the single Raude. Raude is a mix between a traditional Fijian music form called "meke" and modern dance rhythms and sounds brought in by David Le Roy, producer and co-founder of the 2001 French dance act Daddy DJ. The song Waidebala, also from Voices of Nature has become popular among the Pacific Islander community, including non-Fijians.

Voices of Nature was followed by Rosiloa's second album, Kila...?, in 2002. In 2005, the band released their best-of album, also titled Rosiloa. This best-of included a brand new song, as well as unreleased remixes and behind-the-scenes video footage from the making of Kila...? The band's first tour outside of Oceania was to the United States in 2006. The band's latest studio album was titled Ancient Pulse, released in 2009.

In 2016, Ratusila and Chong parted ways to explore other creative avenues. Chong died on September 25, 2017, after falling ill. He was 48 years old. His funeral was held September 28, 2017. Ratusila said "it was a real shock," and that he was hoping to reunite with him to make more music together. He credits Rosiloa's musical style to Chong's "tell it like it is" approach, stating, "that first album, Memories, was a collection of songs that we used to perform at the Tradewinds Hotel in Lami. And Peter played a huge role in how that album and every other Black Rose and Rosiloa album turned out. He was a stickler for sound. He had a vision of what the band would sound like and would ensure that everybody played their part to bring that vision into fruition. [...] I believe that the music that Black Rose and Rosiloa created, recorded and produced is testament to Peter's music genius.”

In 2023, Rosiloa recorded Fiji's official song in order to show support for the Fijian rugby team at the 2023 Rugby World Cup, Drua i Valu. It was written about the twins appearing on Fiji's national coat of arms. To celebrate the band coming together for the first time in fourteen years, they went on tour around the Pacific, starting in Port Moresby, Papua New Guinea on October 21.

In 2010, the band released a live album recorded at Tjibaou Cultural Center in New Caledonia, playing some of their most well-known songs, called Melanesia 2010. Melanesia 2010 became officially available for streaming on August 8, 2025.

On July 5, 2025, at the end of a three-day celebration, Rosiloa, among other prolific Fijian musical artists, played a free "Gratitude Concert" at Albert Park, Suva to celebrate the 40th anniversary of Communications Fiji Limited (otherwise known as CFL). CFL is the parent company of five of Fiji's biggest radio stations, their network covering 90% of the nation.

== Discography ==
- 2000 - Voices of Nature (studio album)
- 2002 - Kila...? (studio album)
- 2005 - Rosiloa (best-of/remix album)
- 2009 - Ancient Pulse (studio album)
- 2010 - Melanesia 2010 (live album, made streamable in 2025)

== Line Up to date ==
- Timoci Matakiviwa" a.k.a..Jim" Ratusila, from Ra Province, (Vocals/Guitars)
- Sirilo "Siri" and "Master Jo" Daurewa, from Narauyaba, Ra Province, (Drums/Vocals)
- , (Guitars/Percussion/Vocals)
- Apisai "Bis" Naulivou from Nanoko, Nadroga, (Keyboards/Vocals)
- Taione Kaloucava.. (Keyboard/vocals)
- Mataika Vulaca..Synth Bass/vocals
- Timoci Sivowale..Electric Guitar/vocals
- Mesa Sisiwa..Vocals/Acoustic guitar
- Seniyaro "Yaro" Matakiviwa, from Ra Province, (Traditional Meke Dancer/Vocals)(Traditional Meke Dancer/Vocals)
