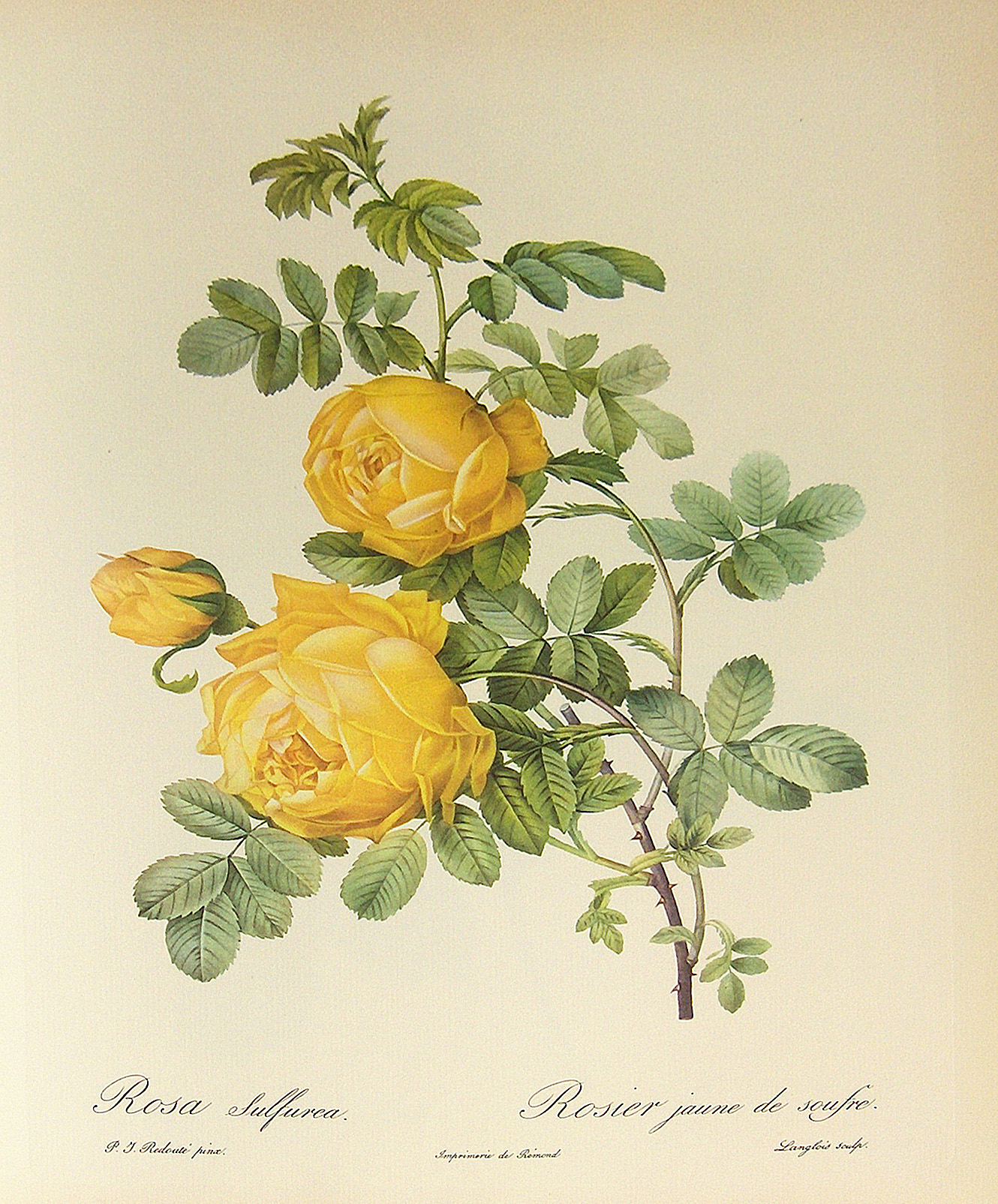
- Watercolor by Pierre-Joseph Redouté of a double-flowered garden form

Scientific classification
- Kingdom: Plantae
- Clade: Tracheophytes
- Clade: Angiosperms
- Clade: Eudicots
- Clade: Rosids
- Order: Rosales
- Family: Rosaceae
- Genus: Rosa
- Species: R. hemisphaerica

Binomial name
- Rosa hemisphaerica Herrm. 1762

Synonyms
- Rosa raphinii Boiss. & Balansa; Rosa sulphurea Dryand.

= Rosa hemisphaerica =

Species of flowering plant

Rosa hemisphaerica, also known as the sulphur rose, is a rose species with pale yellow flowers native to western Asia. The wild form, known as Rosa raphinii, has single flowers with five petals. A double-flowered form was one of the first yellow roses introduced to European gardens; John Bellenden Ker Gawler stated in 1815 that the species had been cultivated in England for nearly 200 years. The scent of the flowers has been described as unpleasant.

== Etymology ==
The name Rosa hemisphaerica refers to the half-rounded fruit and ovaries, Latin "pomo hemisphaerico ... Germen hemisphaericum".

== Description ==
Rosa hemisphaerica is a prickly shrub that grows to about 1.5 metres (4 ft 11 in) high with grey-green leaves of five to seven leaflets. The hips are orange. It blooms only in the spring.

== See also ==
- List of Rosa species
