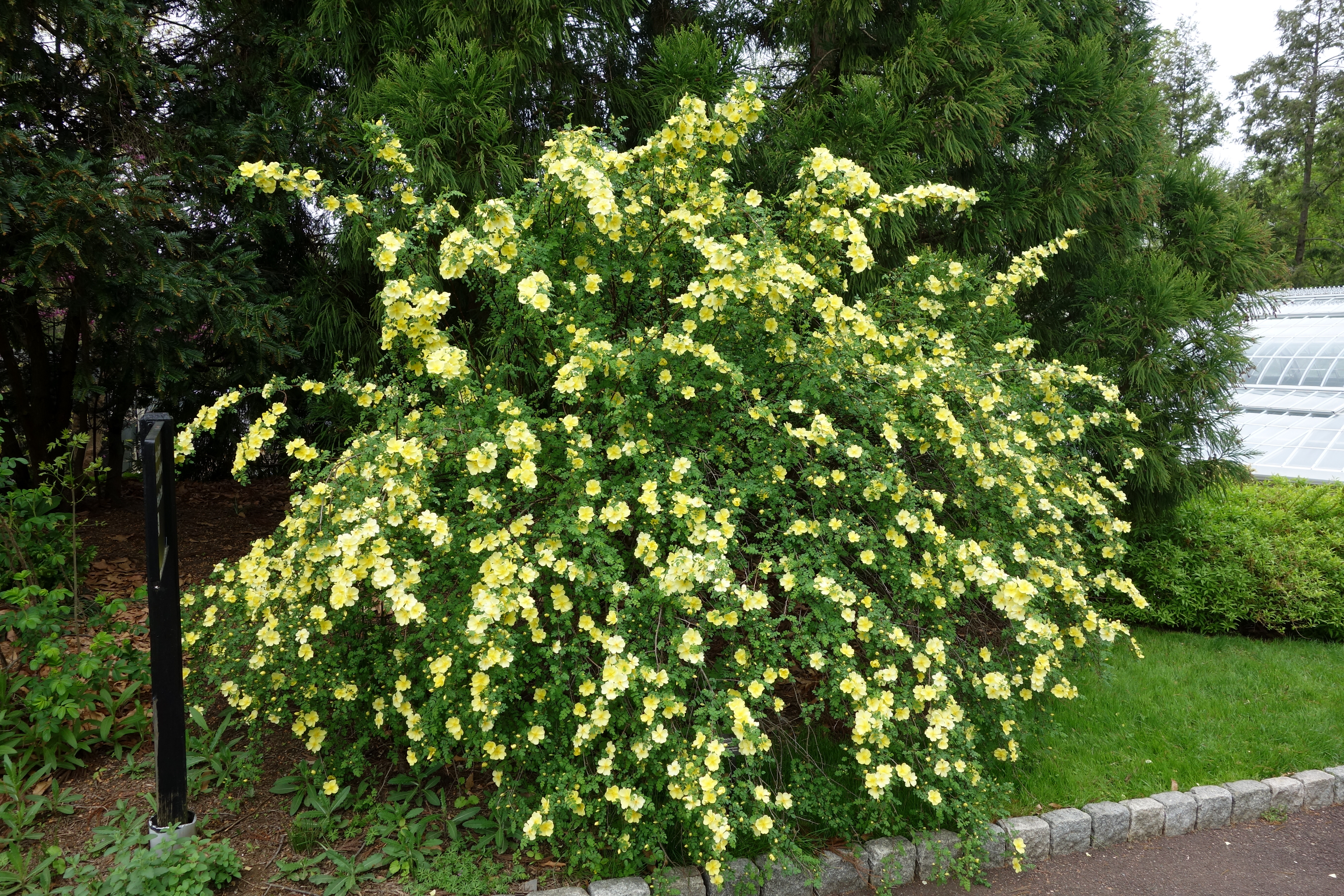
- In bloom

Scientific classification
- Kingdom: Plantae
- Clade: Embryophytes
- Clade: Tracheophytes
- Clade: Spermatophytes
- Clade: Angiosperms
- Clade: Eudicots
- Clade: Rosids
- Order: Rosales
- Family: Rosaceae
- Genus: Rosa
- Species: R. xanthina

Binomial name
- Rosa xanthina Lindl.

Synonyms
- List: Rosa hugonis Hemsl.; Rosa xanthina f. hugonis (Hemsl.) A.V.Roberts; Rosa xanthinoides Nakai

= Rosa xanthina =

Species of flowering plant

Rosa xanthina, the yellow rose or Manchu rose, is a species of flowering plant in the family Rosaceae, native to China, Mongolia, and Korea. Its cultivar 'Canary Bird' has gained the Royal Horticultural Society's Award of Garden Merit.
