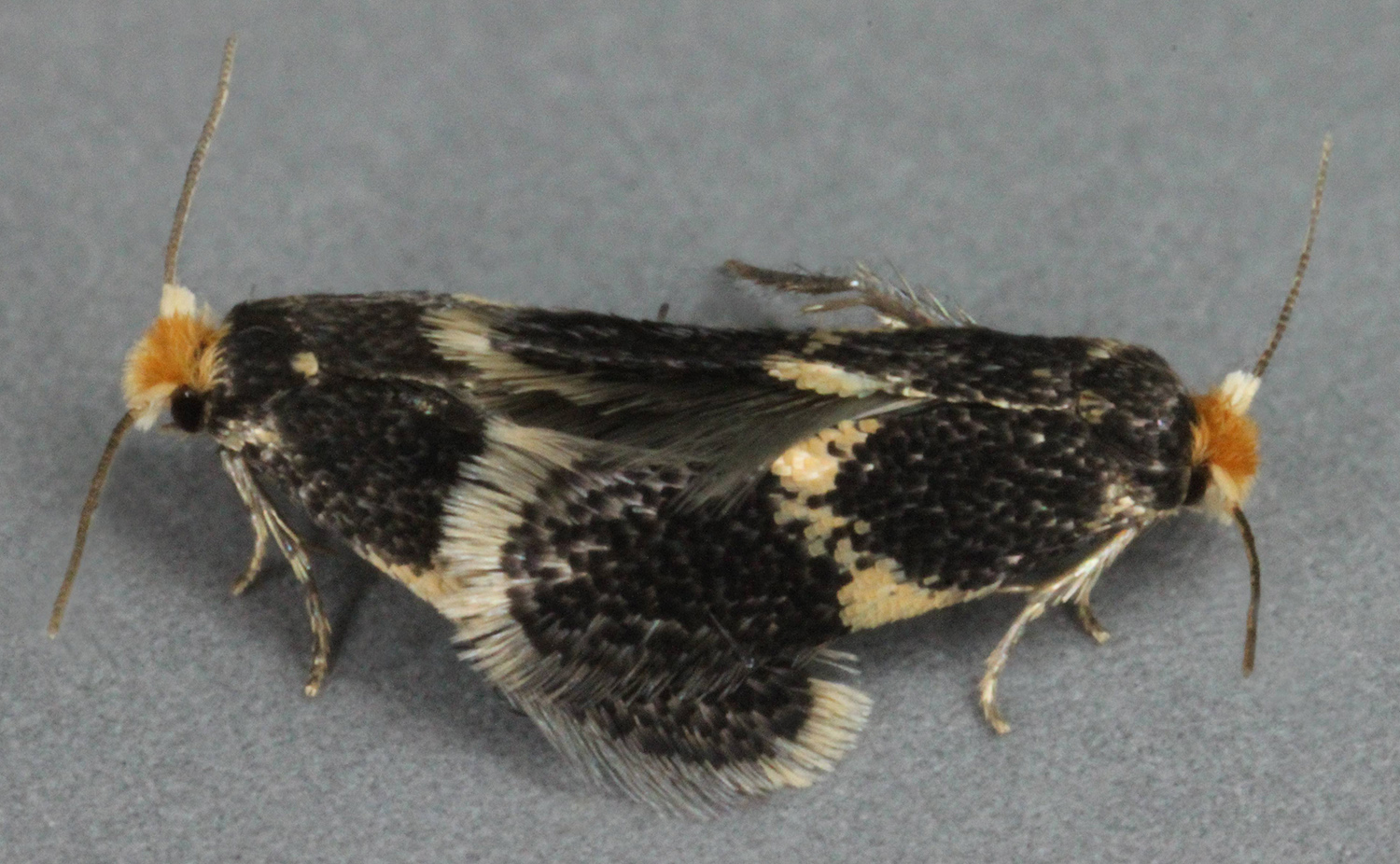
- Ectoedemia angulifasciella, pair in copula Trawscoed, North Wales, May 2011

Scientific classification
- Kingdom: Animalia
- Phylum: Arthropoda
- Clade: Pancrustacea
- Class: Insecta
- Order: Lepidoptera
- Family: Nepticulidae
- Genus: Ectoedemia
- Species: E. angulifasciella

Binomial name
- Ectoedemia angulifasciella (Stainton, 1849)

Synonyms
- Nepticula angulifasciella Stainton, 1849; Nepticula brunniella Sauber, 1904; Nepticula minorella Zimmermann, 1944; Nepticula schleichiella Frey, 1870; Nepticula utensis Weber, 1937

= Ectoedemia angulifasciella =

Species of moth

Ectoedemia angulifasciella is a moth of the family Nepticulidae. It is found in most of Europe, except the Mediterranean Islands.

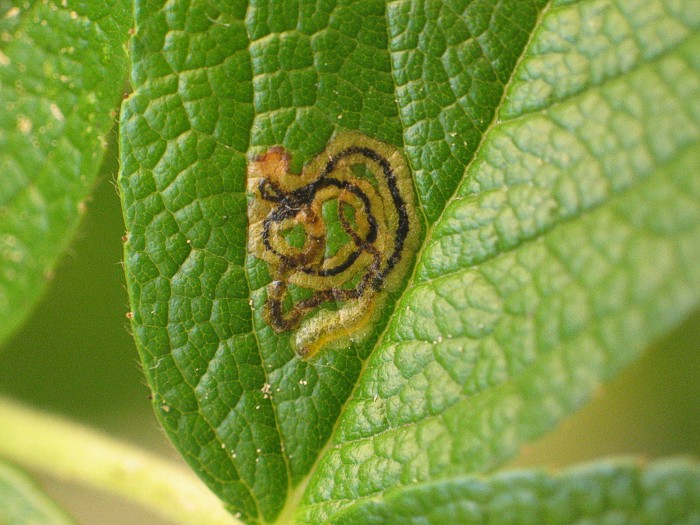
Damage

The wingspan is 5–6 mm. The head is pale ochreous and the antennal eyecaps ochreous-white. The forewings are black with a somewhat bent sometimes interrupted shining silvery fascia in middle. The outer half of cilia beyond a black line are white. Hind wings are grey. van Nieukerken provides a key and description.

Adults are on wing in July.

The larvae feed on Filipendula vulgaris, Rosa canina, Rosa pendulina, Rosa sempervirens, Sanguisorba minor and Sanguisorba officinalis. They mine the leaves of their host plant.
