= Pennisetia bohemica =

Scientific classification
- Kingdom: Animalia
- Phylum: Arthropoda
- Clade: Pancrustacea
- Class: Insecta
- Order: Lepidoptera
- Family: Sesiidae
- Genus: Pennisetia
- Species: P. bohemica

Binomial name
- Pennisetia bohemica Kralicek & Povolny, 1974

Species of moth

Pennisetia bohemica is a moth of the family Sesiidae. It is found in the Czech Republic, Slovenia, Croatia and Greece.

The wingspan is 25–32 mm. Adults are on wing from the end of July to September.

The larvae feed on Rosa canina and Rosa arvensis. They feed on the roots of their host plant for two years.
