= Rosa anemoniflora =

Scientific classification
- Kingdom: Plantae
- Clade: Tracheophytes
- Clade: Angiosperms
- Clade: Eudicots
- Clade: Rosids
- Order: Rosales
- Family: Rosaceae
- Genus: Rosa
- Species: R. anemoniflora

Binomial name
- Rosa anemoniflora Fortune ex Lindl.

Synonyms
- Rosa triphylla; Rosa sempervirens var. anemoniflora

Species of flowering plant

Rosa anemoniflora is a species of rose found in France.

== See also ==
- List of Rosa species
