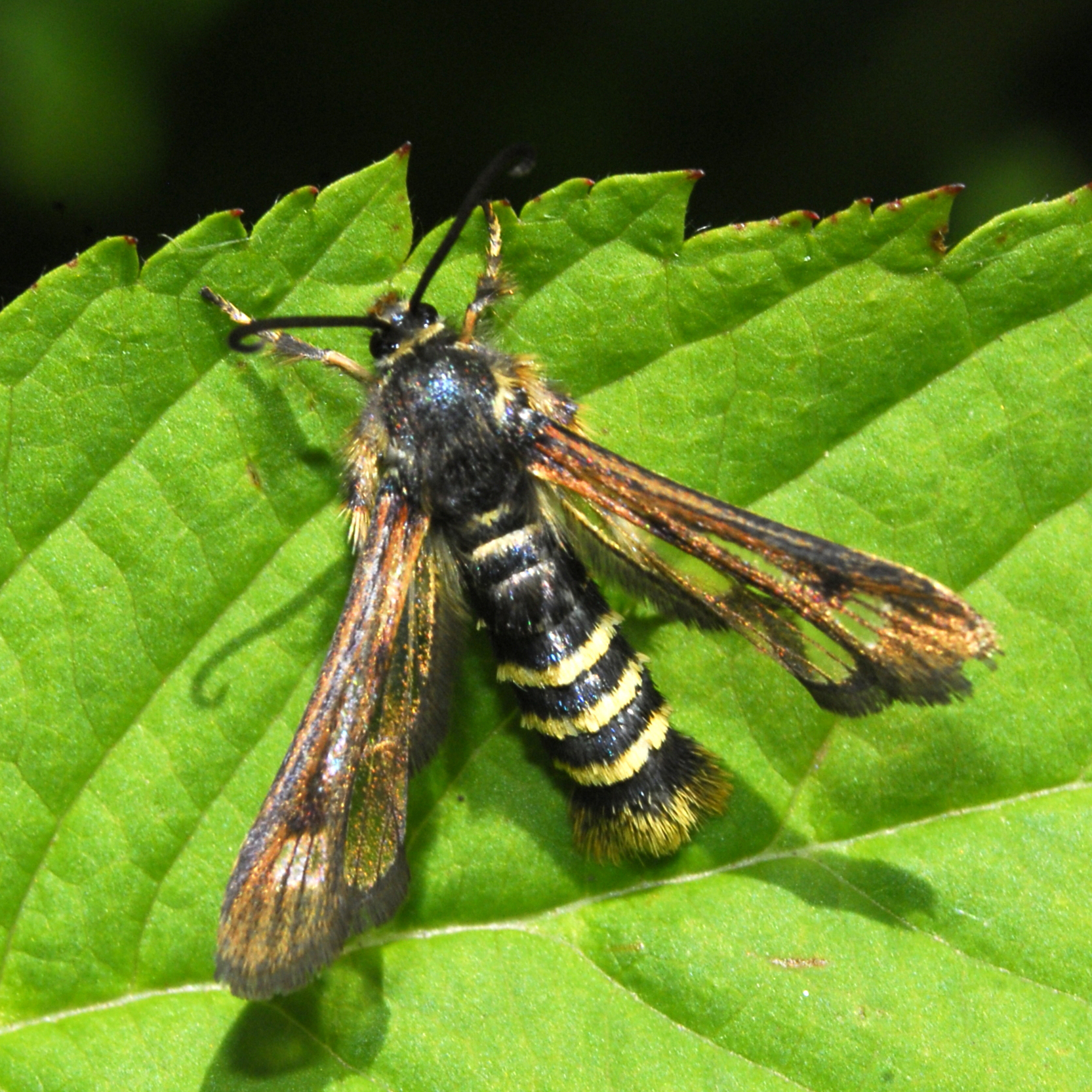
- Pennisetia hylaeiformis

Scientific classification
- Domain: Eukaryota
- Kingdom: Animalia
- Phylum: Arthropoda
- Class: Insecta
- Order: Lepidoptera
- Family: Sesiidae
- Subfamily: Tinthiinae
- Genus: Pennisetia; Dehne, 1850

Species
- See text

= Pennisetia =

Genus of moths

Pennisetia is a genus of moths in the family Sesiidae.

== Species ==
- Pennisetia bohemica Králícek & Povolný, 1974
- Pennisetia fixseni (Leech, 1889)
  - Pennisetia fixseni fixseni (Leech, 1889)
  - Pennisetia fixseni admirabilis Arita, 1992
- Pennisetia hylaeiformis (Laspeyres, 1801)
  - Pennisetia hylaeiformis hylaeiformis (Laspeyres, 1801)
  - Pennisetia hylaeiformis assimilis Arita, 1992
- Pennisetia insulicola Arita 1992
- Pennisetia pectinata (Staudinger 1887)
- Pennisetia marginata (Harris 1839)
- Pennisetia eucheripennis (Boisduval, [1875])
- Pennisetia contracta (Walker, 1856)
- Pennisetia fujianensis Wang & Yang, 2002
- Pennisetia kumaoides Arita & Gorbunov, 2001
- Pennisetia unicingulata Arita & Gorbunov, 2001
