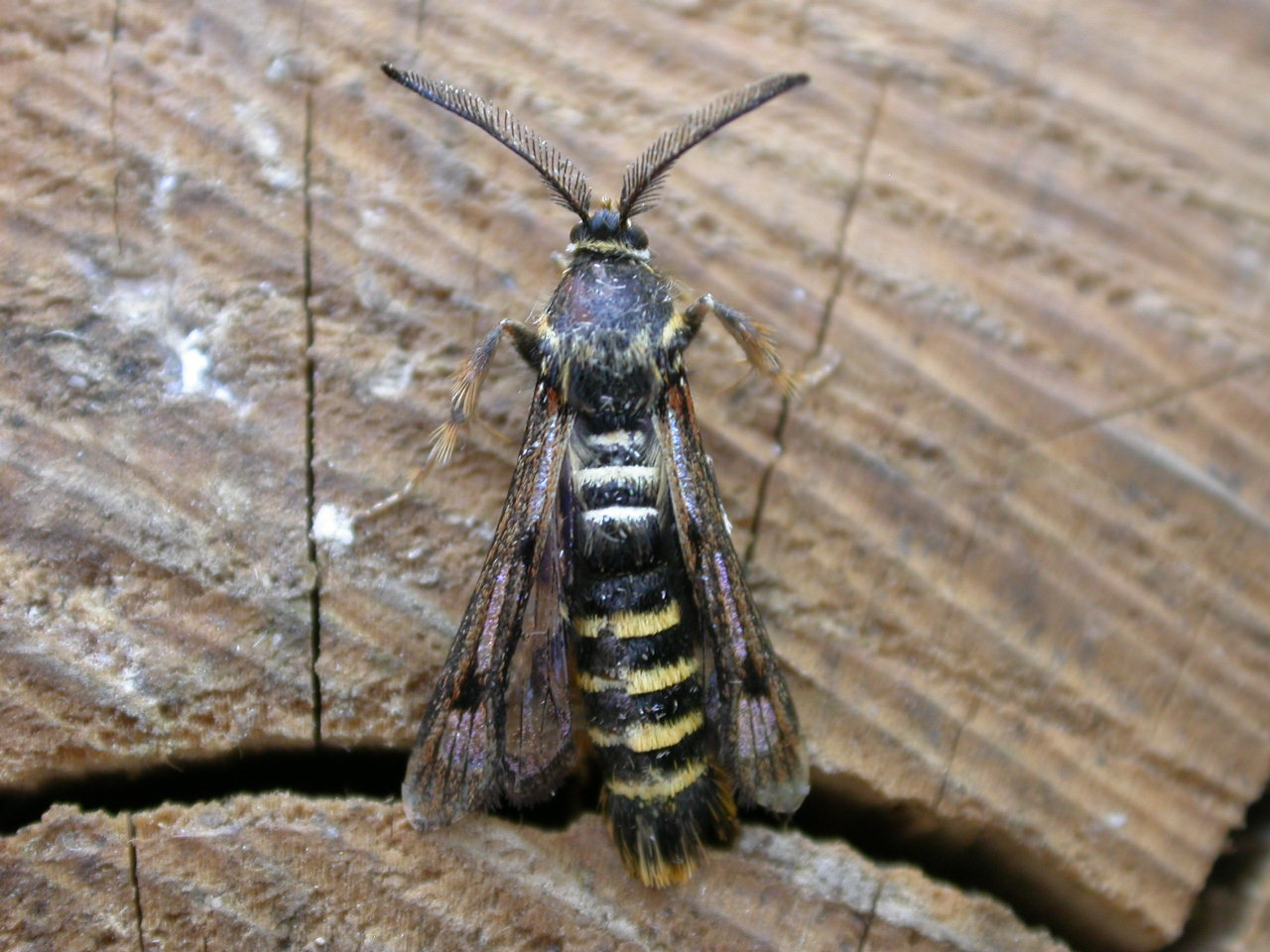
- Pennisetia hylaeiformis. Male, dorsal view
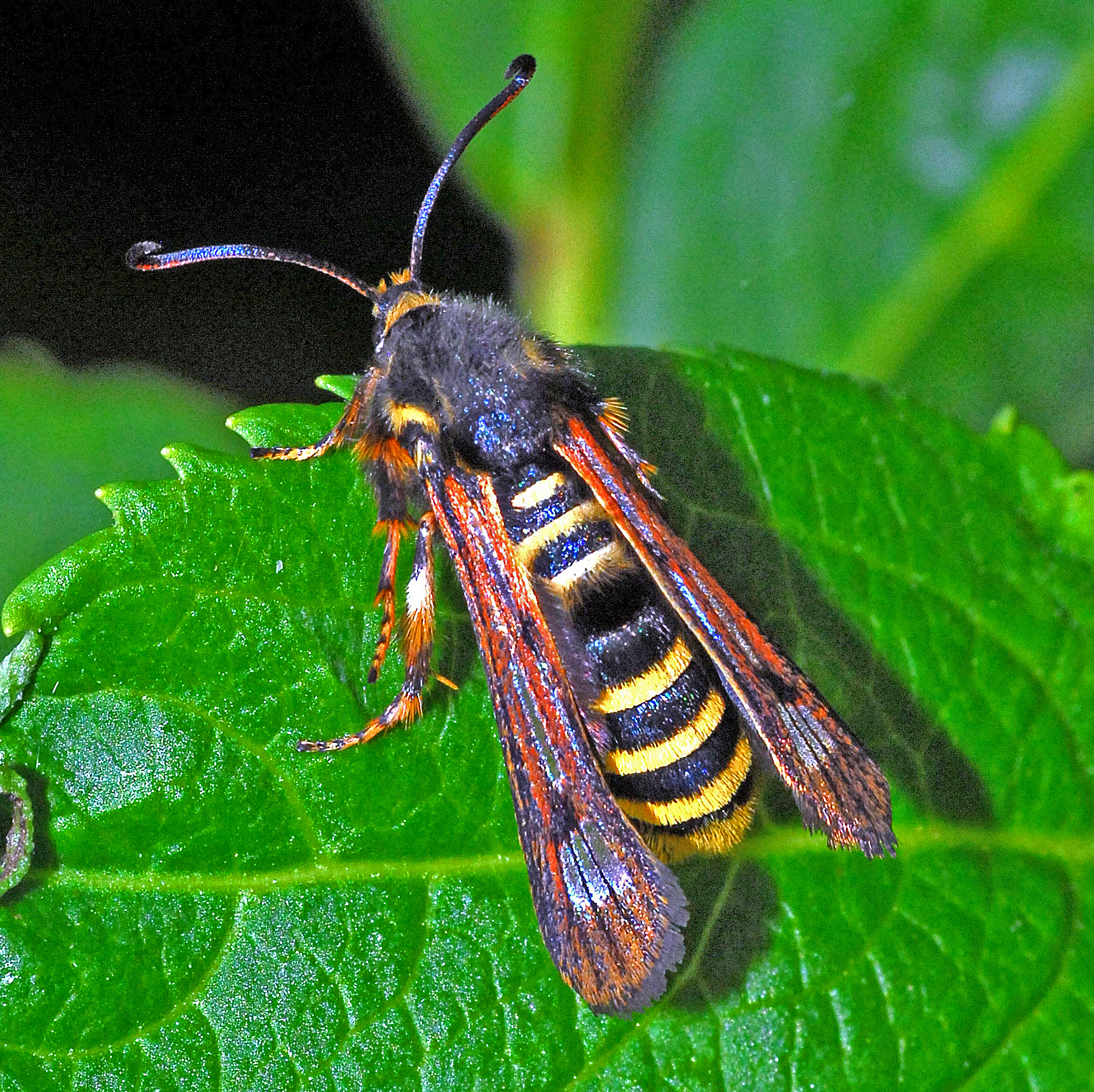
- Female, dorsal view

Scientific classification
- Kingdom: Animalia
- Phylum: Arthropoda
- Clade: Pancrustacea
- Class: Insecta
- Order: Lepidoptera
- Family: Sesiidae
- Genus: Pennisetia
- Species: P. hylaeiformis

Binomial name
- Pennisetia hylaeiformis (Laspeyres, 1801)

Synonyms
- Sesia hylaeiformis Laspeyres, 1801; Sphinx apiformis Hübner, 1796 (nec Clerck, 1759); Pennisetia anomala Dehne, 1850

= Pennisetia hylaeiformis =

Species of moth

Pennisetia hylaeiformis, the raspberry clearwing, is a moth of the family Sesiidae.

== Subspecies ==
- Pennisetia hylaeiformis hylaeiformis
- Pennisetia hylaeiformis assimilis Arita, 1992

== Distribution ==
This species can be found in most of North and Central Europe. It is also present in Caucasus, Transcaspia, Siberia, Manchuria and Japan.

== Description ==
Pennisetia hylaeiformis can reach a wingspan of 22–32 mm. These moths have brown forewings characterized by a narrow transparent wedge shaped area and by a small three-cell outer window. The veins M3 and Cu1 of the hind wings are long stalked. The thorax is black, with a yellow collar and two yellow stripes on mesonotum.

In males the abdomen shows four yellow bands of the same width on seg IV to VII, while females have three bands only (on seg IV to VI), with an orange-brown tail. Antennae are cristate and double-crescent-like shaped in males, while in females they are setaceous. The caterpillars are whitish and have a black head.

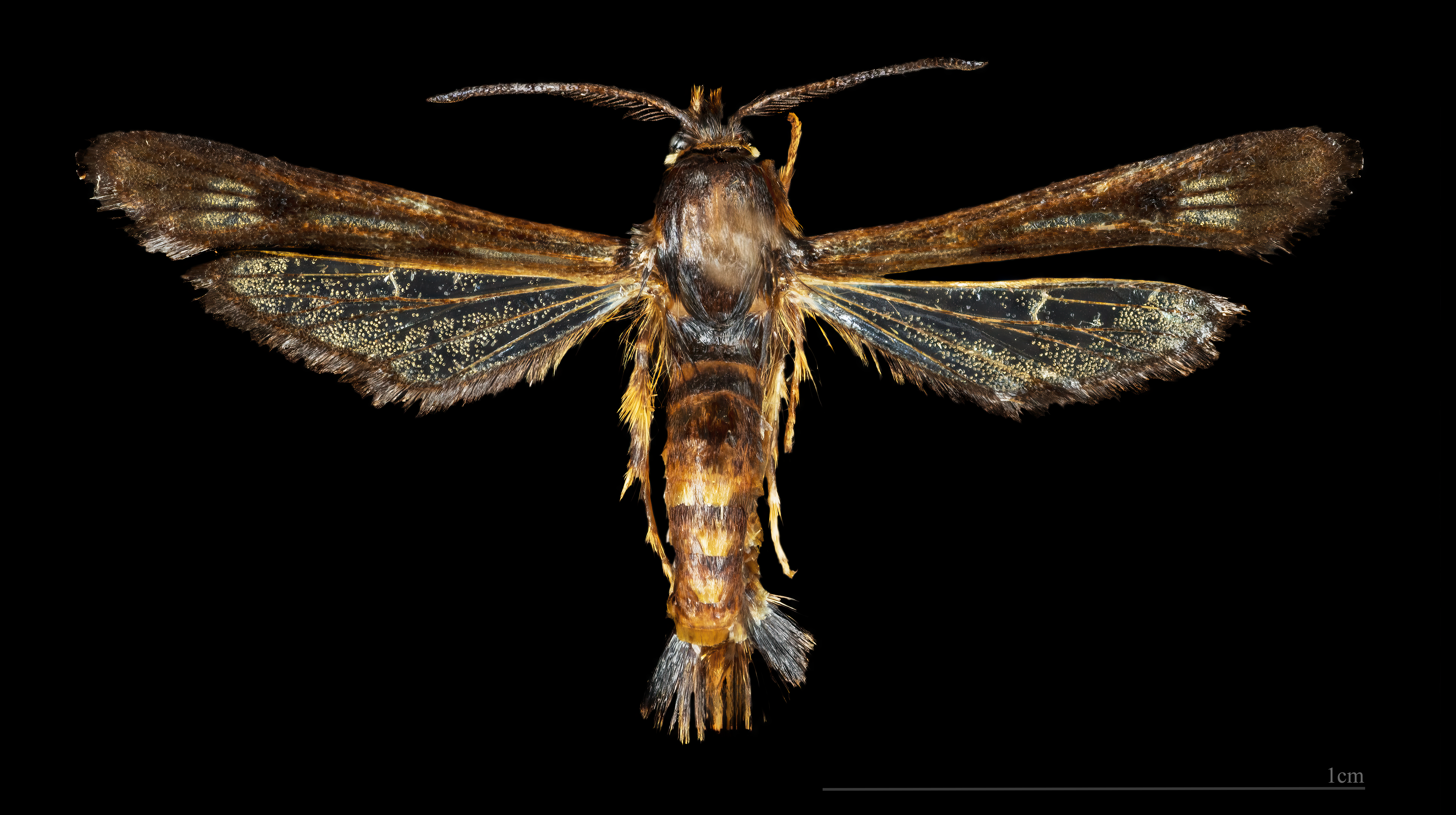
♂

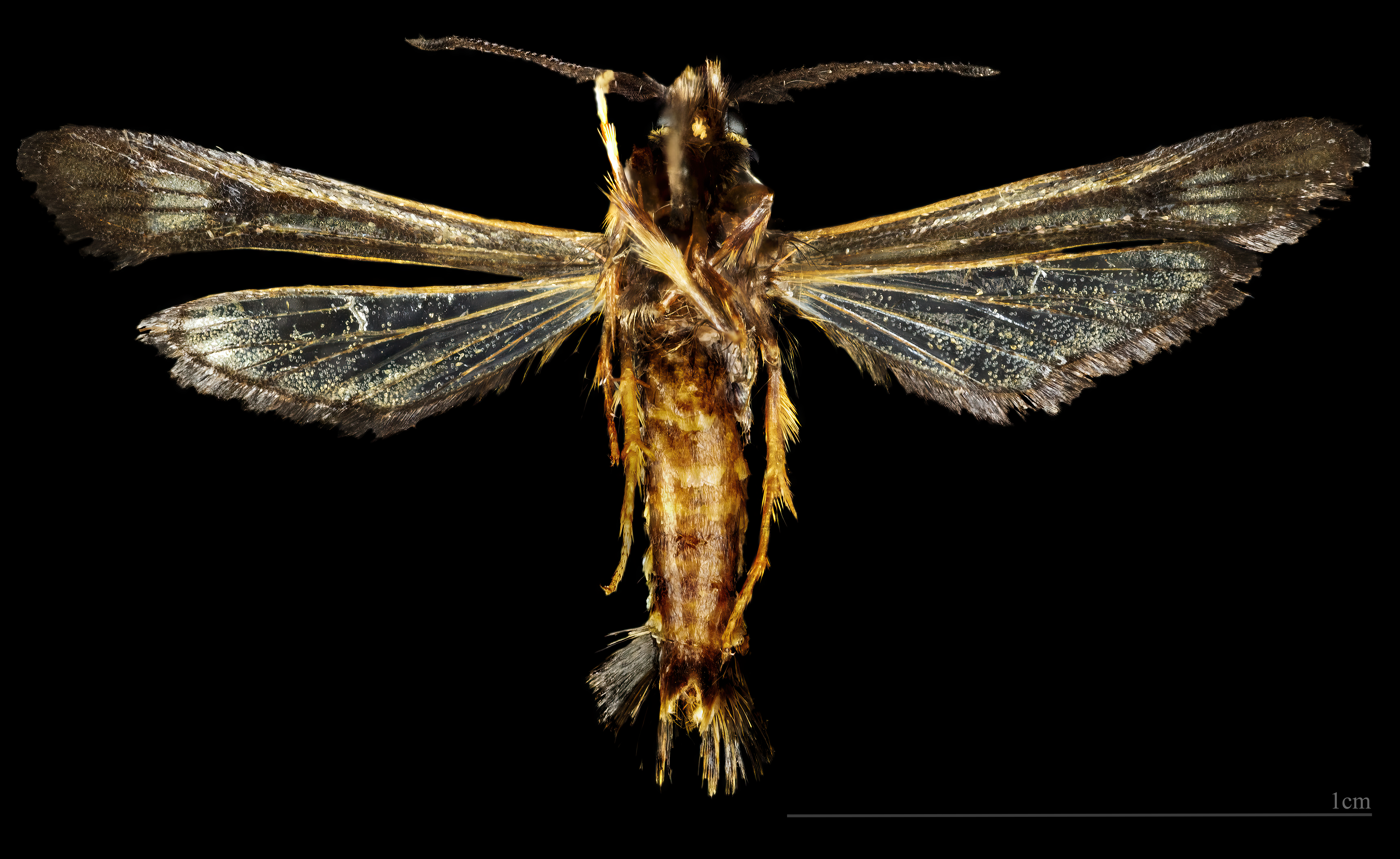
♂ △

== Biology ==
The moth flies from June to August depending on the location. The larvae live in stalk and roots of raspberries (Rubus idaeus, Rubus boisseri, Rubus afzeliana, Rubus fruticosus) and feed on their roots.

Parasitoids of the larvae of the raspberry clearwings are various Ichneumonidae and Braconidae species such as Liotryphon punctulatus, Apanteles glomeratus, Lissanota pimplator, Bracon erraticus and Macrocentrus marginator.

== Gallery ==
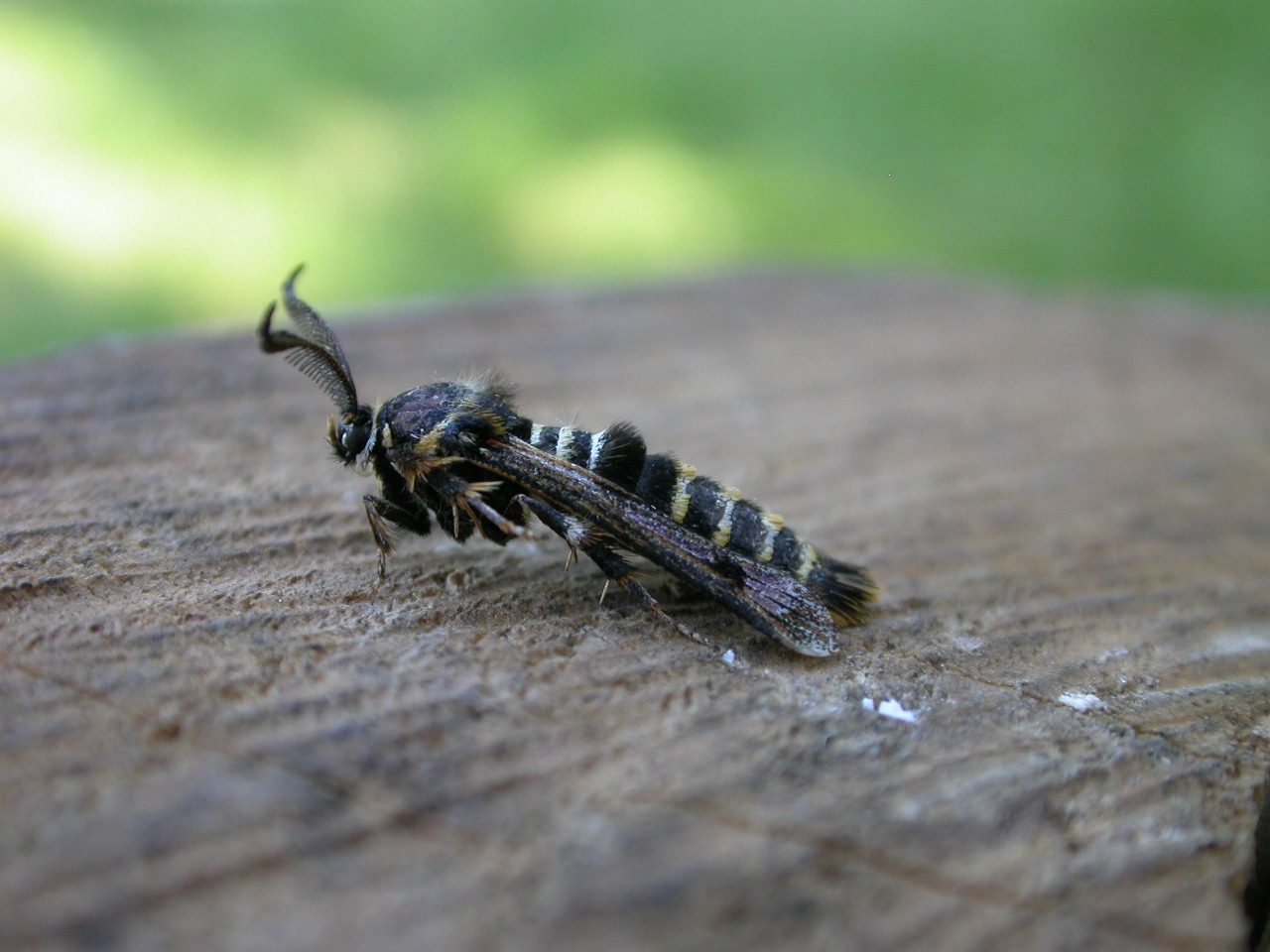
Male, side view

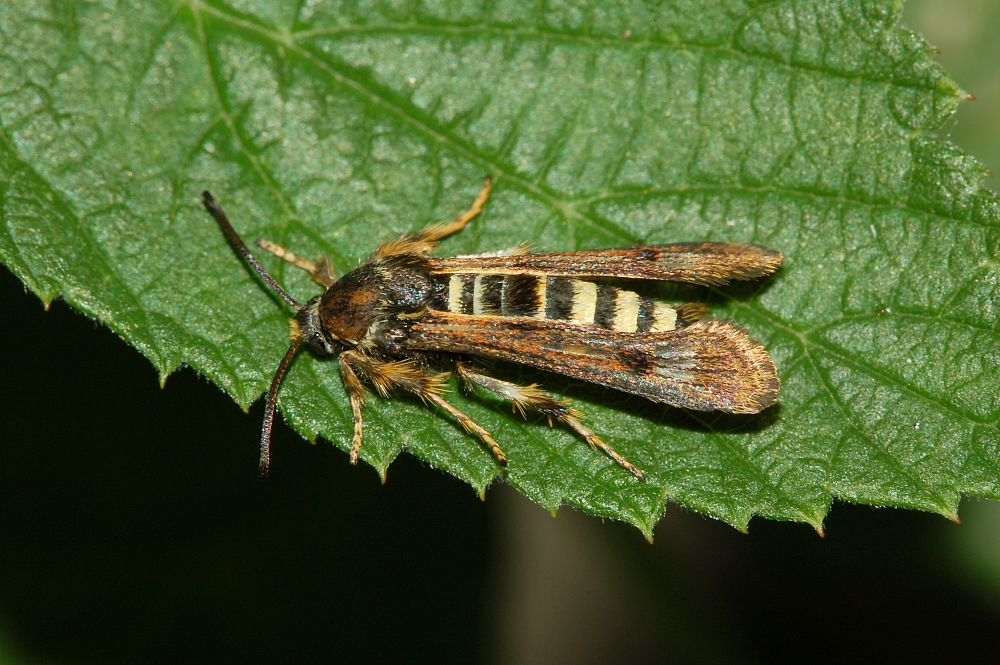
Female, side view
