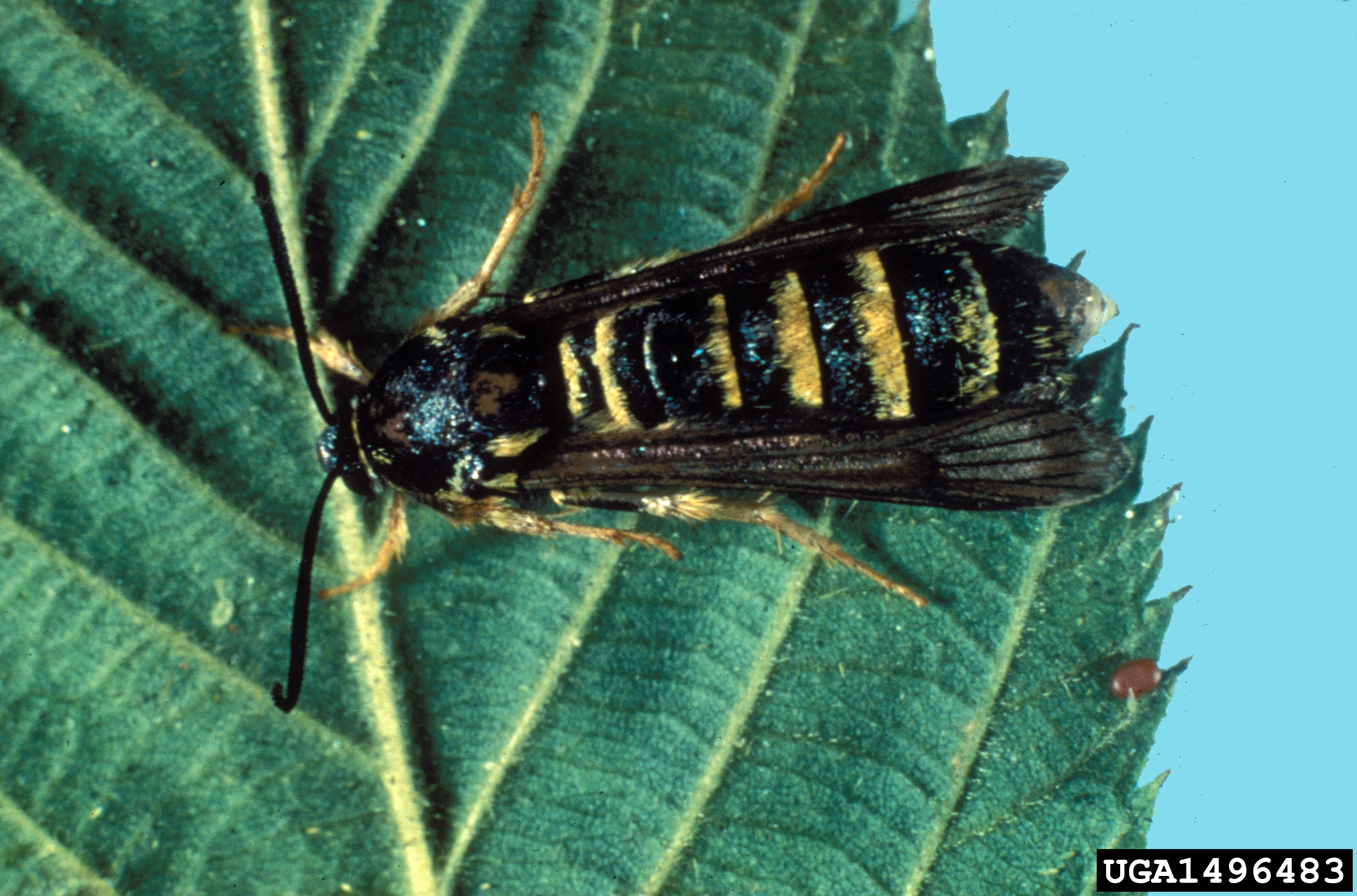

Scientific classification
- Kingdom: Animalia
- Phylum: Arthropoda
- Class: Insecta
- Order: Lepidoptera
- Family: Sesiidae
- Genus: Pennisetia
- Species: P. marginatum

Binomial name
- Pennisetia marginatum (Harris, 1839)

Synonyms
- Trochilium marginata Harris, 1839; Pennisetia pleciaeformis (Walker, 1856); Pennisetia odyneripennis (Walker, 1856); Aegeria rubi Riley, 1874; Pennisetia flavipes (Hulst, 1881); Pennisetia albicoma (Hulst, 1883)

= Pennisetia marginata =

Species of moth

Pennisetia marginata, the raspberry crown borer or blackberry clearwing borer, is a moth of the family Sesiidae. The species was first described by Thaddeus William Harris in 1839. It is widespread in the United States, mainly in the east and along the Pacific Coast, ranging north into the southern parts of Canada. It is an introduced species in Hawaii.

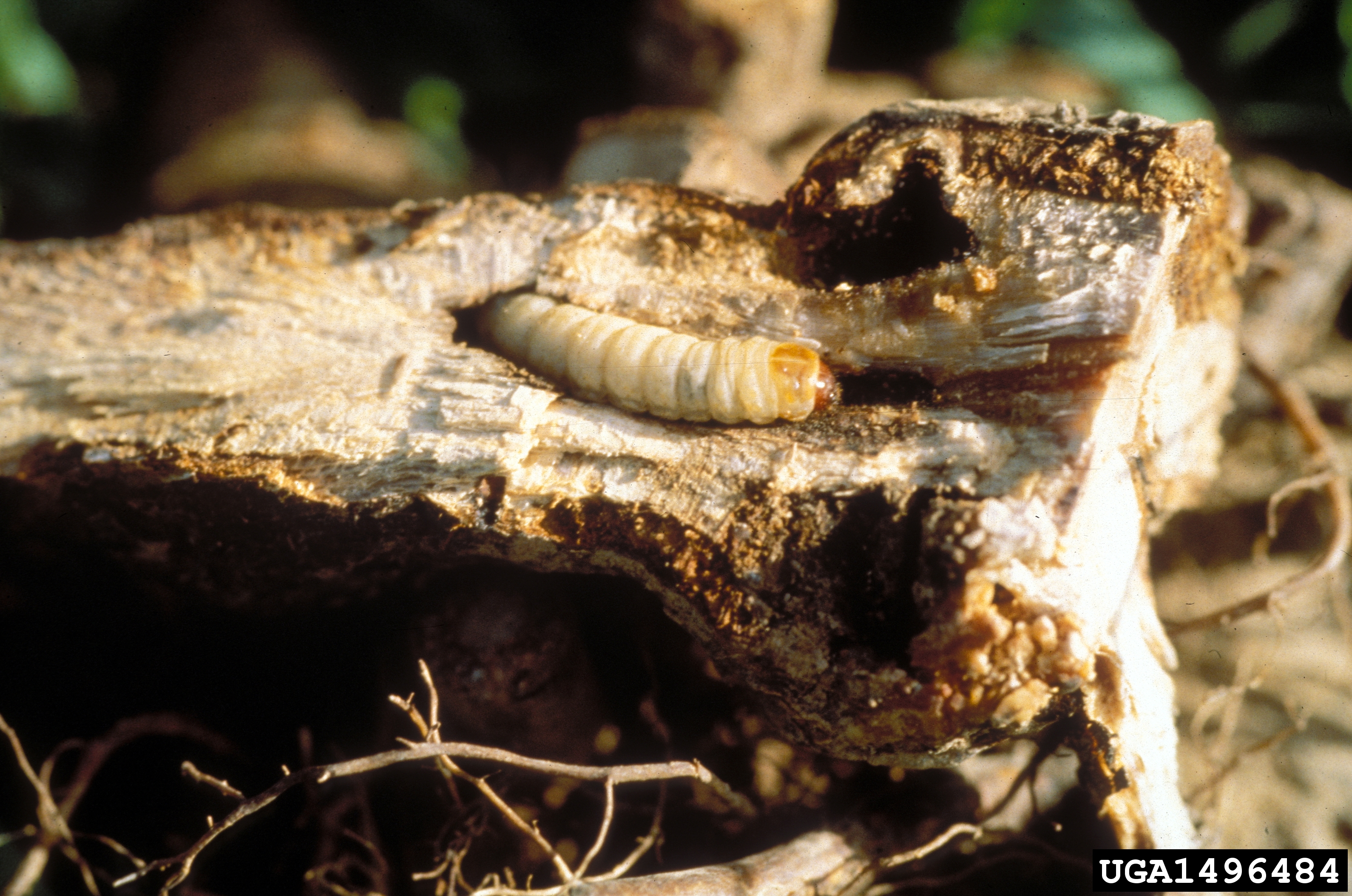
Larva

The wingspan is 20–35 mm. Adults are on wing from July to September and are active during the day.

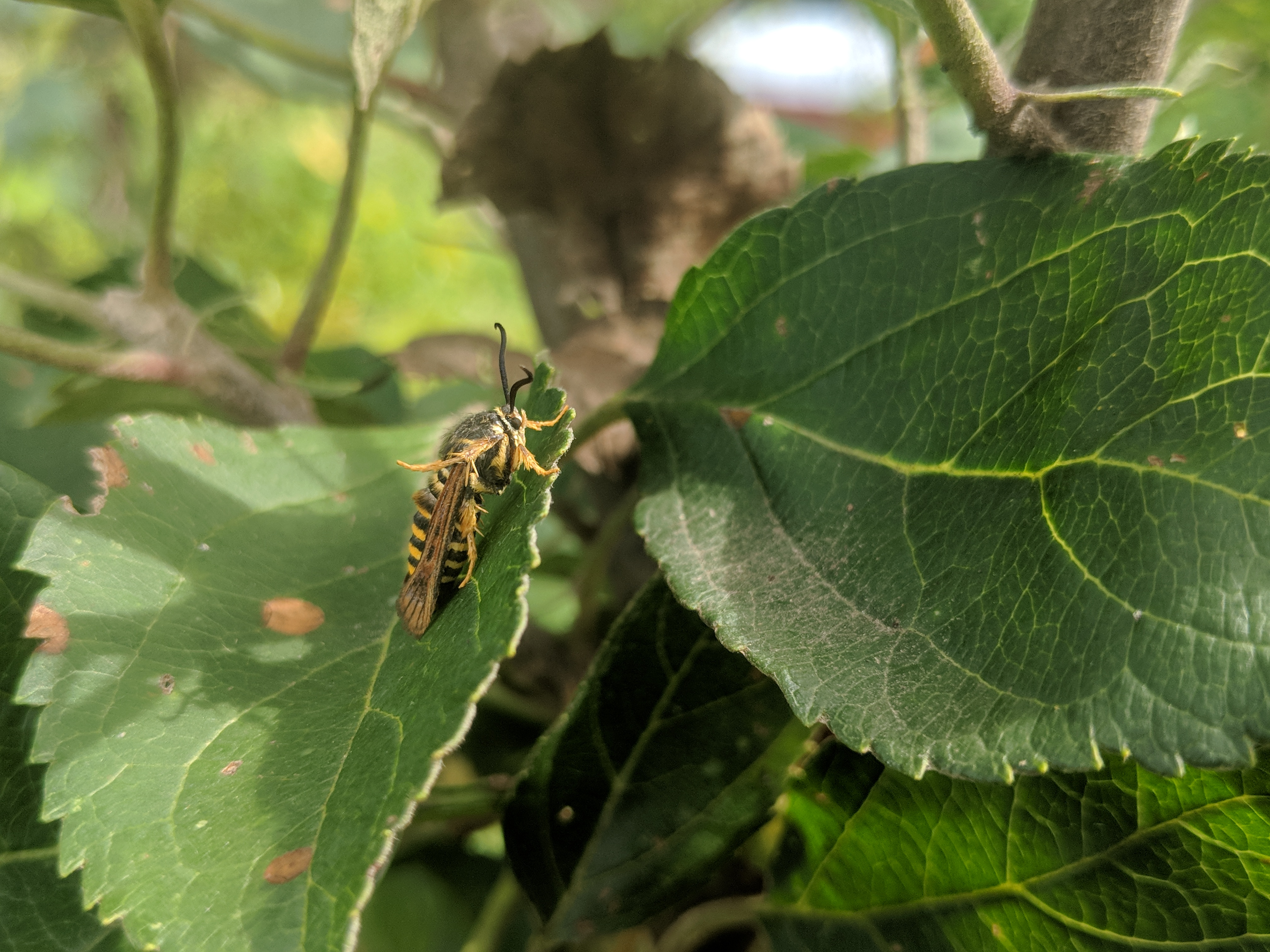
Adult

The larvae feed on Rubus species. They bore in the rootstock and root crowns of their host plant.

The complete life cycle requires two years in most cases, although some complete in a single year.
