= Rosa × polliniana =

Scientific classification
- Kingdom: Plantae
- Clade: Tracheophytes
- Clade: Angiosperms
- Clade: Eudicots
- Clade: Rosids
- Order: Rosales
- Family: Rosaceae
- Genus: Rosa
- Species: R. × polliniana

Binomial name
- Rosa × polliniana Spreng.

Synonyms
- List: Rosa × arenivaga Déségl. ex Jull.-Crosn.; Rosa × axmannii C.C.Gmel.; Rosa × axmannii var. coriacea Borbás; Rosa × axmannii var. macrocalyx Borbás; Rosa × badenburgensis Döll; Rosa × beckii Heinr.Braun; Rosa × conica Chabert ex Cariot; Rosa × conica var. acutifolia Boullu; Rosa × decipiens Boreau; Rosa × fasciculiflora Boullu; Rosa × fourraei Déségl.; Rosa gallica f. mirabilis (Déségl.) R.Keller; Rosa gallica f. muscipula (Boullu) R.Keller; Rosa gallica var. subinermis (Chabert) R.Keller; Rosa × geminata Boreau; Rosa × geminata var. fourraei (Déségl.) Boullu; Rosa × geminata var. opacifolia (Chabert) Boullu; Rosa × hispidocarpa (J.B.Keller) Heinr.Braun; Rosa × hybrida Schleich.; Rosa hybrida var. semirepens Borbás; Rosa hybrida f. setosissima Vuk.; Rosa hybrida var. subcordata Borbás; Rosa × incomparabilis Chabert; Rosa × kalksburgensis Wiesb.; Rosa × mirabilis Déségl.; Rosa × muscipula Boullu; Rosa × neilreichii Wiesb. ex J.B.Keller; Rosa × opacifolia Chabert; Rosa × polliniana var. acutifolia (Boullu) Rouy & E.G.Camus; Rosa × polliniana var. ambigua Rouy & E.G.Camus; Rosa × polliniana var. arenivaga (Déségl. ex Jull.-Crosn.) Rouy & E.G.Camus; Rosa × polliniana var. coriacea (Borbás) Prodan; Rosa × polliniana var. decipiens (Boreau) Rouy & E.G.Camus; Rosa × polliniana var. dura Rouy & E.G.Camus; Rosa × polliniana var. fasciculiflora (Boullu) Rouy & E.G.Camus; Rosa × polliniana var. kalksburgensis (Wiesb.) Ker.-Nagy; Rosa × polliniana var. mirabilis (Déségl.) Rouy & E.G.Camus; Rosa × polliniana var. muscipula (Boullu) Rouy & E.G.Camus; Rosa × polliniana var. rhombifolia (Boullu) Rouy & E.G.Camus; Rosa × polliniana var. schleicheri (Heinr.Braun) Prodan; Rosa × polliniana var. setosissima (Vuk.) Ker.-Nagy; Rosa × polliniana var. stylaris Rouy & E.G.Camus; Rosa × polliniana var. subcordata (Borbás) Prodan; Rosa × polliniana var. umbellata R.Keller ex Prodan; Rosa × polliniana var. variegata (Boullu) Rouy & E.G.Camus; Rosa × rhombifolia Boullu; Rosa × schleicheri Heinr.Braun; Rosa × schleicheri var. beckii (Heinr.Braun) Heinr.Braun; Rosa × schleicheri var. conica (Chabert ex Cariot) Rouy & E.G.Camus; Rosa × schleicheri var. flexilis Rouy & E.G.Camus; Rosa × schleicheri var. fourraei (Déségl.) Rouy & E.G.Camus; Rosa × schleicheri var. incomparabilis (Chabert) Rouy & E.G.Camus; Rosa × schleicheri var. kalksburgensis (Wiesb.) Heinr.Braun; Rosa × schleicheri var. neilreichii (Wiesb. ex J.B.Keller) Heinr.Braun; Rosa × schleicheri var. opacifolia (Chabert) Rouy & E.G.Camus; Rosa × schleicheri var. semirepens (Borbás) Rouy & E.G.Camus; Rosa × schleicheri var. subinermis (Chabert) Rouy & E.G.Camus; Rosa × schleicheri var. sublaevis (Boullu) Rouy & E.G.Camus; Rosa × schleicheri var. tenella (Boullu) Rouy & E.G.Camus; Rosa × schleicheri var. typica Heinr.Braun; Rosa × schleicheri var. veprium Rouy & E.G.Camus; Rosa × schleicheri var. wiedermannii Heinr.Braun; Rosa × subinermis Chabert; Rosa × subinermis var. hispidocarpa J.B.Keller; Rosa × sublaevis Boullu; Rosa × subrepens Borbás ex Vuk.; Rosa × tenella Boullu; Rosa × variegata Boullu

Species of plant

Rosa × polliniana is a naturally occurring hybrid species of flowering plant in the family Rosaceae. A highly variable shrub, its parents are Rosa arvensis (the field rose) and Rosa gallica (the French rose). It occurs sporadically in Europe where the parent species' ranges overlap; Germany, Switzerland, Hungary, and the former Yugoslavia, with stands in France and Italy. Although fertile, it does not appear to have been particularly successful. When it is cultivated, it is typically under the name Rosa hybrida.
