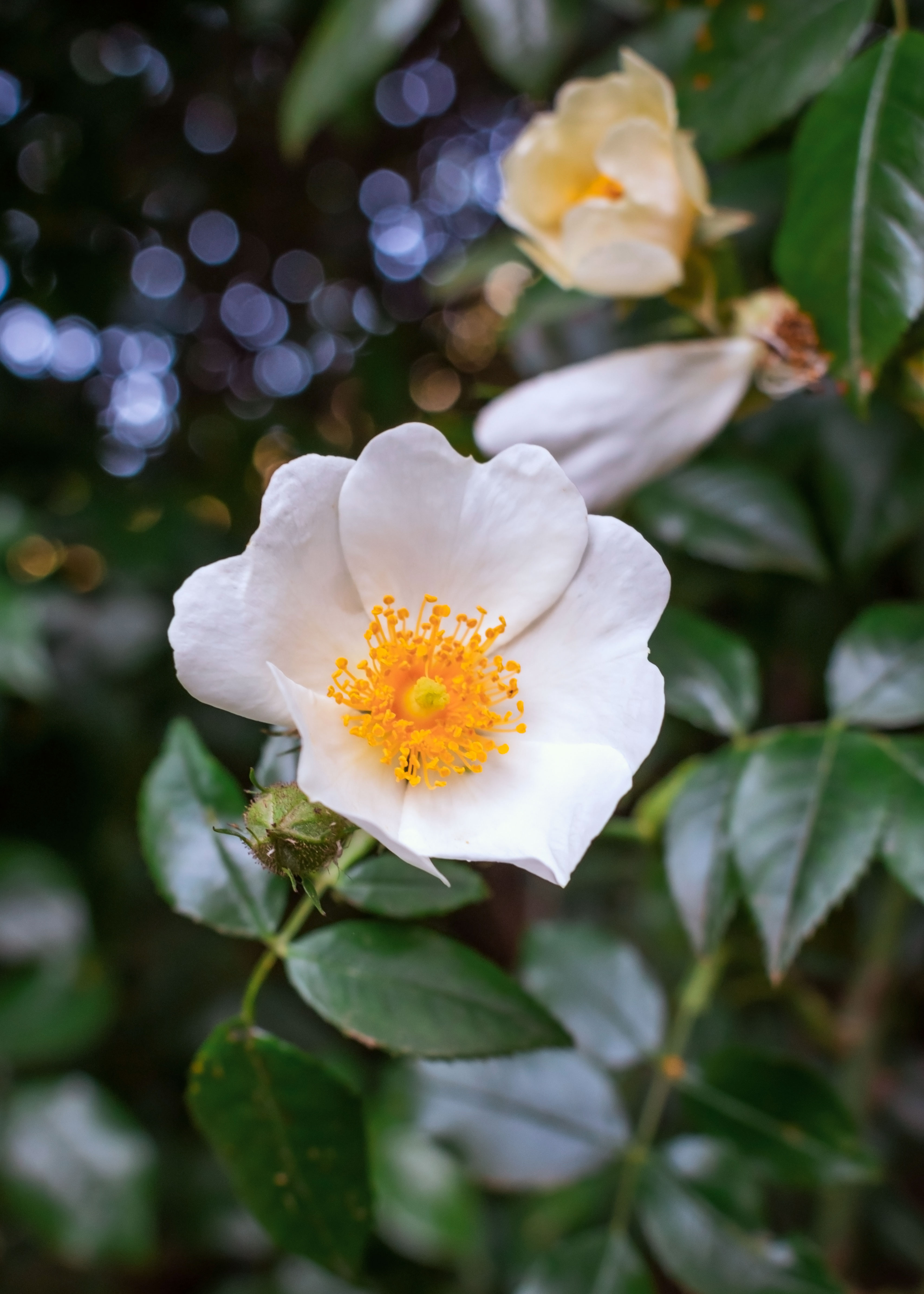

Scientific classification
- Kingdom: Plantae
- Clade: Tracheophytes
- Clade: Angiosperms
- Clade: Eudicots
- Clade: Rosids
- Order: Rosales
- Family: Rosaceae
- Genus: Rosa
- Species: R. sempervirens

Binomial name
- Rosa sempervirens L.

= Rosa sempervirens =

Species of vine

Rosa sempervirens, the evergreen rose, is a species of wild rose native to the Mediterranean. It is a climbing perennial with very prickly stems.

== Classification ==
Rosa sempervirens L. is most closely related to Rosa phoenicia Boiss. and Rosa arvensis Huds..

It was used repeatedly as parent for hybrids produced by Henri Antoine Jacques, gardener to King Louis Philippe I of France.

== Habitat ==
It is an evergreen shrub mostly growing in maquis or in sheltered valleys. Its distribution encompasses mainland Greece, some Aegean islands (including Crete), the Adriatic coast of the Balkans, Italy, the islands in the Western Mediterranean, some coastal areas of the Iberian peninsula and France (up to 700 m in the Maritime Alps, and northwards up to the southernmost parts of Brittany), in the north of Morocco and Algeria, and in more isolated instances in the Atlas Mountains and in European Turkey.

== Description ==
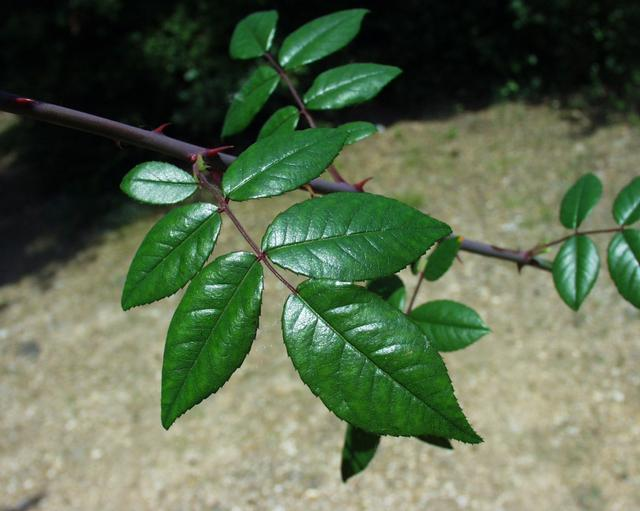
Leaves of plant

Rosa sempervirens leaves are glossy, compound-pinnate and evergreen. It is a bushy shrub that can reach 1.5 meters high, growing in hedges or forming thickets. Climbing forms can reach 3.5 m in height. The stems bear few, slightly curved prickles.

The imparipinnate leaves generally have five leaflets, sometimes seven. The leaflets, lanceolate oval, shiny on their upper surface, glabrous, with tight edges, are 2 to 5 cm long. These relatively leathery, dark green leaves persist much of the winter.

The white, simple, slightly fragrant flowers, 3 to 5 cm in diameter, are grouped together in sparse corymbs. They bloom in spring and early summer from May to July, or in spring and early summer. The fruits, globular or ovoid, orange-red when ripe, are about 1 cm long.

== See also ==
- Rosa anemoniflora = Rosa sempervirens var. anemoniflora
- Media related to Rosa sempervirens at Wikimedia Commons
