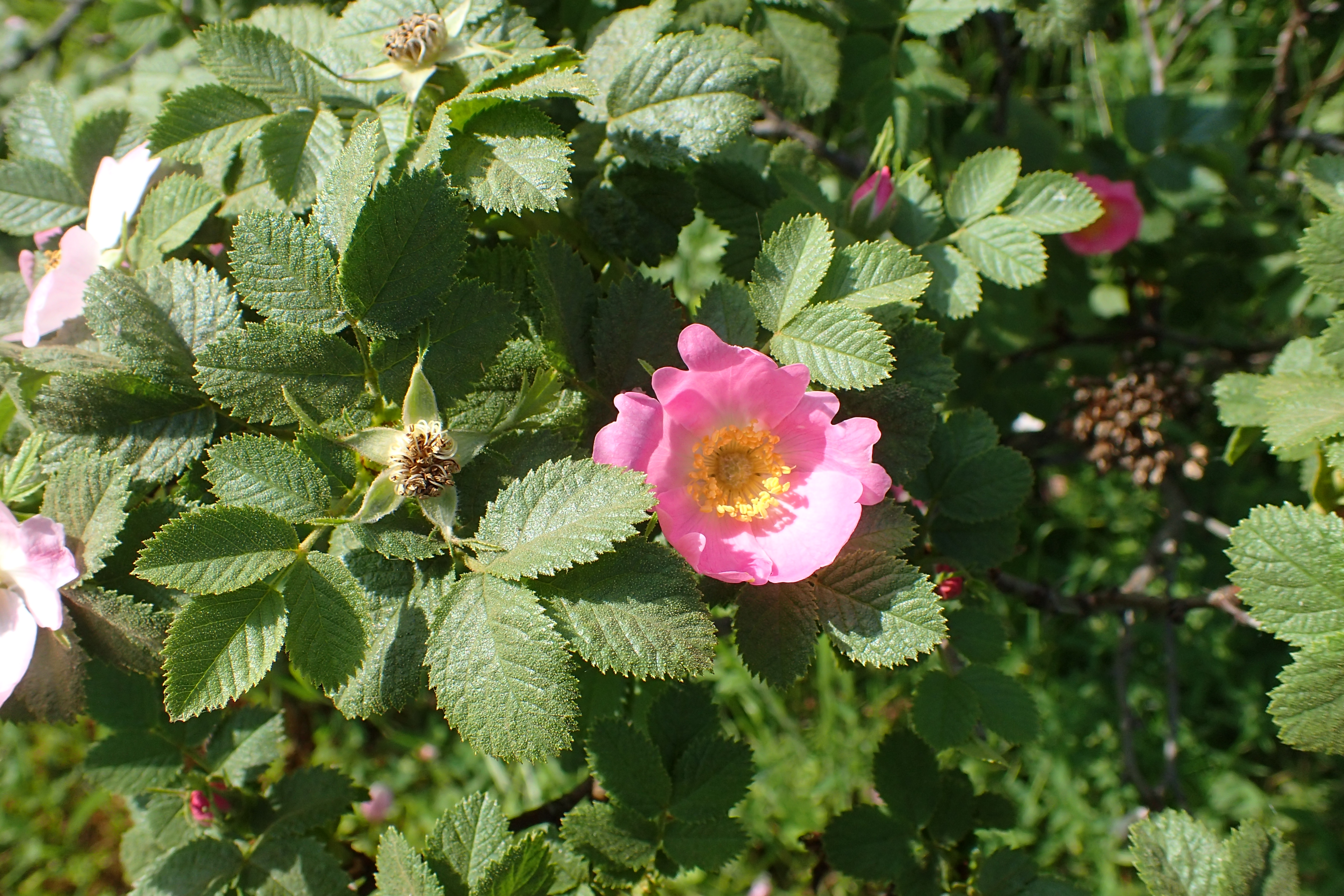
- Flower and leaves
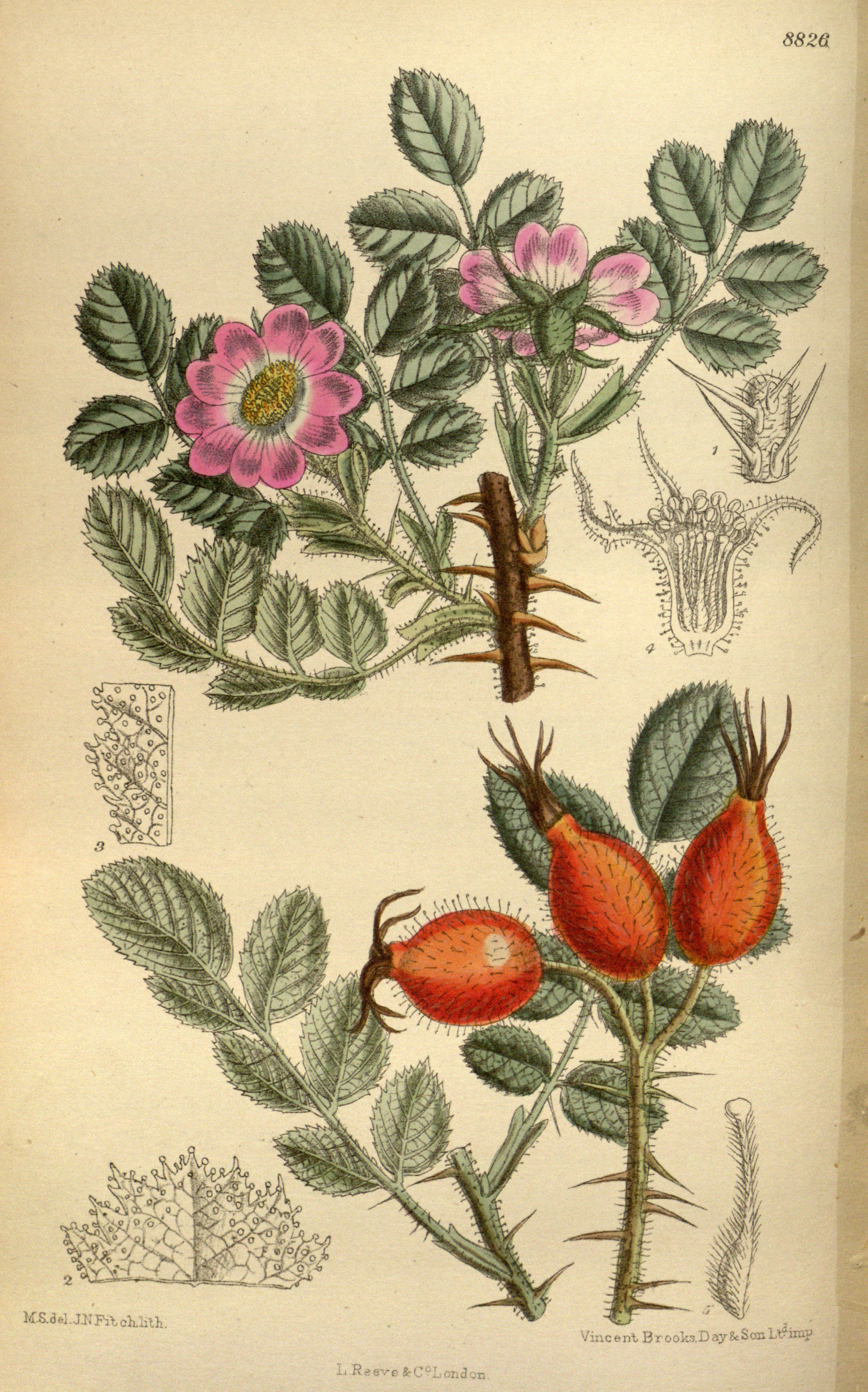
- Botanical illustration

Scientific classification
- Kingdom: Plantae
- Clade: Tracheophytes
- Clade: Angiosperms
- Clade: Eudicots
- Clade: Rosids
- Order: Rosales
- Family: Rosaceae
- Genus: Rosa
- Species: R. pulverulenta

Binomial name
- Rosa pulverulenta M.Bieb.

Synonyms
- List: Pugetia pulverulenta (M.Bieb.) Gand.; Rosa agrestis subsp. sicula (Tratt.) Christ; Rosa azerbaidshanica Novopokr. & Rzazade; Rosa brachiata Déségl.; Rosa bulgarica Dimitrov; Rosa calabrica Huter ex Burnat & Gremli; Rosa calabrica var. thuretii Burnat & Gremli; Rosa coquebertii Burnat & Gremli; Rosa dalmatica A.Kern.; Rosa dalmatica var. frivaldskyi Degen; Rosa ferox Regel; Rosa glutinosa Sm.; Rosa glutinosa var. athoensis Crép.; Rosa glutinosa subsp. dalmatica (A.Kern.) Heinr.Braun; Rosa glutinosa var. dalmatica (A.Kern.) R.Keller; Rosa glutinosa f. elongatipes R.Keller; Rosa glutinosa var. grandifolia Boiss. ex Burnat & Gremli; Rosa glutinosa f. heldreichii R.Keller; Rosa glutinosa var. leioclada Christ; Rosa glutinosa var. lioclada (Christ) R.Keller; Rosa glutinosa var. lubensis J.B.Keller & Formánek; Rosa glutinosa f. minor Heinr.Braun; Rosa glutinosa var. pilata Klášt.; Rosa glutinosa subsp. pustulosa (Bertol.) Arcang.; Rosa glutinosa f. sicula Christ; Rosa glutinosa subsp. sicula (Tratt.) Arcang.; Rosa glutinosa subsp. thuretii (Burnat & Gremli) Arcang.; Rosa glutinosa var. thuretii (Burnat & Gremli) Halácsy; Rosa glutinosa var. typica Hayek; Rosa heckeliana var. sicula (Tratt.) Nyman; Rosa hermanni Burnat & Gremli; Rosa kossii Galushko; Rosa libanotica Boiss.; Rosa maginae Cuatrec.; Rosa mairei Sennen; Rosa micrantha var. mairei Maire; Rosa montana var. gracilens Crép.; Rosa nisami Sosn.; Rosa pulverulenta var. cryptopoda (Baker) Baker; Rosa pulverulenta var. dalmatica (A.Kern.) Popek & Facsar; Rosa pulverulenta var. eriocarpa Ser.; Rosa pustulosa Bertol.; Rosa rhodopaea Dimitrov; Rosa rubiginosa subsp. sicula (Tratt.) Malag.; Rosa rubiginosa subsp. thuretii (Burnat & Gremli) Christ; Rosa sachokiana Jarosch.; Rosa sachokiana var. macrophylla Jarosch.; Rosa serafinii f. veridica Christ; Rosa serafinii var. veridica (Christ) Burnat & Gremli; Rosa serafinii subsp. veridica (Christ) Arcang.; Rosa sicula Tratt.; Rosa sicula subvar. aemula Burnat & Gremli; Rosa sicula var. gracilens (Crép.) Pau; Rosa sicula var. gussonii Burnat & Gremli; Rosa sicula var. hispanica Debeaux & É.Rev.; Rosa sicula f. hispanica Debeaux & É.Rev. ex Pau; Rosa sicula subvar. isarana R.Keller; Rosa sicula subvar. maroccana Burnat & Gremli; Rosa sicula var. maroccana Crép. ex Magnier; Rosa sicula f. pedunculata Pau; Rosa sicula var. pilosa R.Keller; Rosa sicula var. setigera R.Keller; Rosa sicula var. subsessiliflora (Boullu) Rouy & E.G.Camus; Rosa sicula subvar. subsessiliflora (Boullu) Burnat & Gremli; Rosa sicula var. thuretii (Burnat & Gremli) Crép.; Rosa sicula subvar. thuretii (Burnat & Gremli) C.Vicioso; Rosa sicula var. veridica (Christ) Burnat & Gremli; Rosa sicula subsp. veridica (Christ) Arcang.; Rosa sjuniki Jarosch.; Rosa sjunikii Jarosch.; Rosa steppofruticetorum Ponert; Rosa strobliana Burnat & Gremli; Rosa subsessiliflora Boullu; Rosa subsessiliflora var. ucenensis (Boullu) Boullu; Rosa tchegemensis Galushko; Rosa thuretii (Burnat & Gremli) Burnat & Gremli; Rosa ucenensis Boullu; Rosa viscaria subsp. sicula (Tratt.) Rouy & E.G.Camus; Rosa viscaria var. subsessiliflora (Boullu) Rouy & E.G.Camus; Rosa viscaria var. thuretii (Burnat & Gremli) Rouy & E.G.Camus; Rosa viscaria var. veridica (Christ) Rouy & E.G.Camus; Rosa zasljensis J.B.Keller ex Formánek; Rubus cordifolius var. dalmatica (A.Kern.) C.K.Schneid.

= Rosa pulverulenta =

Species of plant

Rosa pulverulenta (syn. Rosa glutinosa Sm.), the Cretan rose, is a species of flowering plant in the family Rosaceae. It is native to the Mediterranean, the Caucasus, and western Asia, and it has been introduced to Argentina. An aromatic, compact shrub, its stems are densely covered in larger stiff prickles, smaller needle-like prickles, and bristles of glandular origin.

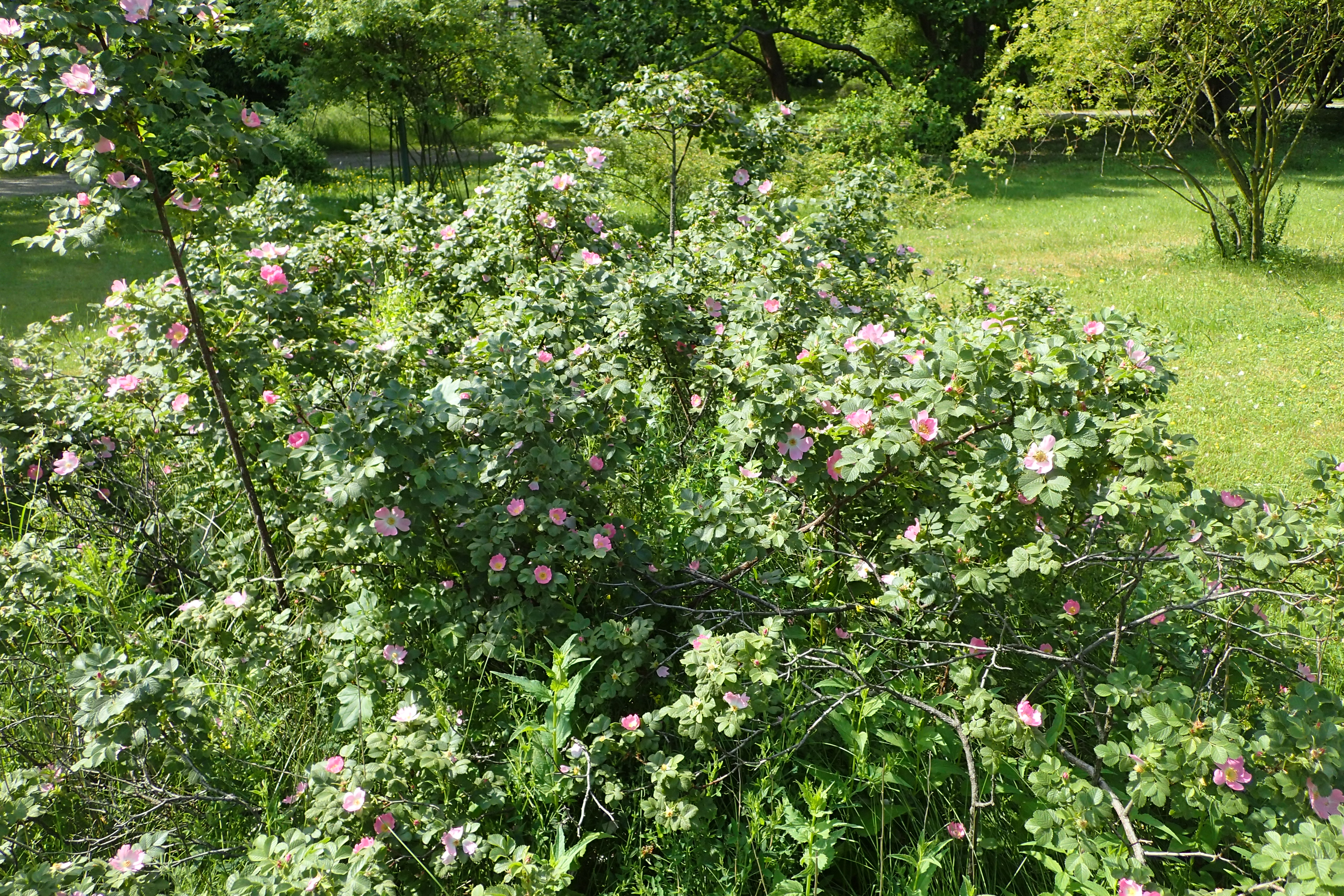
Habit
