= Rosa azerbaidshanica =

Conservation status
- Data Deficient (IUCN 3.1)

Scientific classification
- Kingdom: Plantae
- Clade: Tracheophytes
- Clade: Angiosperms
- Clade: Eudicots
- Clade: Rosids
- Order: Rosales
- Family: Rosaceae
- Genus: Rosa
- Species: R. azerbaidshanica

Binomial name
- Rosa azerbaidshanica Novopokr. et Rzazade, 1947

Species of flowering plant

Rosa azerbaidshanica is an endemic species of rose, found only in Kalbajar Rayon of Azerbaijan. Most authorities have it as one of the many synonyms of Rosa pulverulenta.
