= List of National Trust properties in England =

This is a list of National Trust properties in England, including any stately home, historic house, castle, abbey, museum or other property in the care of the National Trust in England.

== Bedfordshire ==
- Dunstable Downs
- Sharpenhoe
- Whipsnade Tree Cathedral
- Willington Dovecote and Stables

== Berkshire ==
- Ashdown House
- Basildon Park
- Cock Marsh
- Lardon Chase, the Holies and Lough Down

== Bristol ==
- Blaise Hamlet
- Westbury College Gatehouse

== Buckinghamshire ==
- Ascott House
- Ashridge Estate
- Boarstall Duck Decoy
- Boarstall Tower
- Bradenham Village
- Buckingham Chantry Chapel
- Claydon House
- Cliveden
- Coombe Hill
- Dorneywood Garden
- Hartwell House
- Hughenden Manor
- The King's Head Inn, Aylesbury
- Long Crendon Courthouse
- Pitstone Windmill
- Princes Risborough Manor House
- Stowe Gardens
- Waddesdon Manor
- West Wycombe Park
- West Wycombe Village

== Cambridgeshire ==
- Anglesey Abbey, Garden & Lode Mill
- Houghton Mill
- Peckover House & Garden
- Ramsey Abbey Gatehouse
- Wicken Fen
- Wimpole Hall
- Wimpole Home Farm

== Cheshire ==
- Alderley Edge
- Dunham Massey
- Helsby Hill
- Hare Hill
- Little Moreton Hall
- Lyme Park
- Nether Alderley Mill
- Quarry Bank Mill and Styal Estate
- Tatton Park

== Cornwall ==
- Antony House
- Boscastle
- Botallack Mine
- Cadsonbury
- Carnewas & Bedruthan Steps
- Cornish Mines & Engines
- Cotehele
- Glendurgan Garden
- Godolphin Estate
- Godrevy
- Hawker's Hut
- Kynance Cove
- Lanhydrock House
- Lawrence House
- Levant Mine & Beam Engine
- Penrose, Cornwall
- Sandymouth Beach
- St Anthony Head
- St Michael's Mount
- Tintagel Old Post Office
- Trelissick Garden
- Trengwainton Garden
- Trerice
- Wheal Coates

== County Durham ==
- Crook Hall

== Cumbria ==
- Acorn Bank Garden & Watermill
- Aira Force
- Allan Bank
- Beatrix Potter Gallery
- Borrowdale
- Bowder Stone
- Buttermere and Ennerdale
- Cartmel Priory Gatehouse
- Cross Keys Inn, Sedbergh
- Dalton Castle
- Derwent Island House
- Fell Foot Park
- Gondola, Coniston Water
- Grasmere and Great Langdale
- Hawkshead and Claife
- Hill Top
- Keld Chapel, Shap
- Old Dungeon Ghyll
- Sandscale Haws
- Sizergh Castle & Garden
- Stagshaw Garden
- Tarn Hows
- Townend
- Ullswater
- Wasdale, Eskdale and Duddon
- Windermere and Troutbeck
- Wordsworth House
- Wray Castle

== Derbyshire ==
- Calke Abbey
- Duffield Castle
- Hardwick Hall
- High Peak Estate
- Ilam Park
- Kedleston Hall
- Longshaw Estate
- Stainsby Mill
- Sudbury Hall
- The Old Manor
- White Peak Estate
- Winster Market House

== Devon ==
- A La Ronde
- Arlington Court
- Baggy Point
- Bolberry Down
- Bradley
- Branscombe — The Old Bakery, Manor Mill & Forge
- Buckland Abbey
- Castle Drogo
- The Church House
- Coleton Fishacre
- Compton Castle
- Finch Foundry
- Greenway
- Heddon Valley Shop
- Killerton
- Knightshayes Court
- Loughwood Meeting House
- Lundy
- Lydford Gorge
- Morte Point
- The Old Mill, Wembury
- Overbeck's
- Parke
- Plymbridge Woods
- Saltram
- Shute Barton
- Watersmeet House

== Dorset ==
- Badbury Rings
- Ballard Down
- Brownsea Island
- Cerne Giant
- Clouds Hill
- Corfe Castle
- Eggardon Hill
- Hambledon Hill
- Hardy Monument
- Hardy's Cottage
- Hod Hill
- Kingston Lacy
- Lambert's Castle
- Lewesdon Hill
- Max Gate
- Old Harry Rocks
- Pilsdon Pen
- Portland House
- Spyway
- Studland Beach
- White Mill

== Essex ==
- Bourne Mill
- Coggeshall Grange Barn
- Danbury Commons and Blakes Wood
- Hatfield Forest
- Northey Island
- Paycocke's
- Ray Island
- Rayleigh Mount

== Gloucestershire ==
- Ashleworth Tithe Barn
- Bibury
- Chedworth Roman Villa
- Dyrham Park
- Hailes Abbey
- Haresfield Beacon and Standish Wood
- Hidcote Manor Garden
- Horton Court
- Little Fleece Bookshop
- Lodge Park and Sherborne Estate
- Part of May Hill
- Minchinhampton Common
- Newark Park
- Snowshill Manor
- Westbury Court Garden
- Woodchester Park

== Greater Manchester ==
- Castlefield Viaduct
- Dunham Massey

== Hampshire ==
- Hinton Ampner
- Ludshott Common and Waggoners Wells
- Mottisfont Abbey
- Sandham Memorial Chapel
- Selborne Common
- Stockbridge Down
- Stockbridge Marsh
- The Vyne
- West Green House
- Winchester City Mill

== Herefordshire ==
- Berrington Hall
- Brockhampton Estate
- Croft Castle
- Cwmmau Farmhouse
- The Weir Garden

== Hertfordshire ==
- Ashridge Estate
- Shaw's Corner

== Isle of Wight ==
- Bembridge Fort
- Bembridge Windmill
- Brighstone Shop
- Borthwood Copse
- Chillerton Down
- Mottistone Manor
- The Needles
- The Needles Batteries
- Newtown Old Town Hall
- St. Catherine's Oratory
- Rosetta Cottage

== Kent ==
- Chartwell
- Chiddingstone
- Cobham Wood and Mausoleum
- Coldrum Long Barrow
- Emmetts Garden
- Ightham Mote
- Knole
- Old Soar Manor
- Oldbury Camp
- One Tree Hill and Bitchet Common
- Owletts
- Quebec House
- Scotney Castle
- Sissinghurst Castle Garden
- Smallhythe Place
- South Foreland Lighthouse
- Sprivers Garden
- St. John's Jerusalem
- Stoneacre
- The White Cliffs of Dover
- Toys Hill

== Lancashire ==
- Gawthorpe Hall
- Rufford Old Hall
- Heysham Head

== Leicestershire ==
- Staunton Harold Church
- Stoneywell
- Ulverscroft Nature Reserve

== Lincolnshire ==
- Belton House
- Grantham House
- Gunby Hall and Monksthorpe chapel
- Sandilands
- Tattershall Castle near Sleaford
- Woolsthorpe Manor

== Greater London ==
- 2 Willow Road
- 22 Parkside
- 575 Wandsworth Road
- Blewcoat School
- Carlyle's House
- Eastbury Manor House
- East Sheen Common
- Fenton House
- George Inn
- Ham House
- Lindsey House
- Morden Hall Park
- Osterley Park
- Petts Wood & Hawkwood
- Rainham Hall
- Red House
- Roman Baths, Strand Lane
- Rules Restaurant
- Selsdon Wood
- Sutton House
- Watermeads

== Merseyside ==
- Formby
- Speke Hall
- 20 Forthlin Road
- 251 Menlove Avenue
- 59 Rodney Street

== Norfolk ==
- Blakeney Point
- Blickling Hall
- Brancaster
- Darrow Wood
- Elizabethan House Museum, Great Yarmouth
- Felbrigg Hall
- Horsey Windpump
- Oxburgh Hall
- Sheringham Park
- St. George's Guildhall, King's Lynn

== Northamptonshire ==
- Canons Ashby House
- Lyveden New Bield
- Priest's House, Easton on the Hill

== Northumberland ==
- Allen Banks & Staward Gorge
- Cherryburn
- Cragside
- Dunstanburgh Castle
- Farne Islands
- George Stephenson's Birthplace
- Hadrian's Wall and Housesteads Roman Fort
- Lindisfarne Castle
- 25.75 km (16 miles) of the Northumberland Coast
- Ros Castle
- St Cuthbert's Cave
- Seaton Delaval Hall
- Wallington Hall

== Nottinghamshire ==
- Clumber Park
- Mr. Straw's House
- The Workhouse, Southwell

== Oxfordshire ==
- Buscot Park
- Chastleton House
- Great Coxwell Barn
- Greys Court
- Lock Cottage, Buscot
- Nuffield Place
- Priory Cottages
- Uffington White Horse

== Shropshire ==
- Attingham Park near Shrewsbury
- Benthall Hall near Ironbridge
- Carding Mill Valley near Church Stretton
- Cronkhill near Shrewsbury
- Dudmaston Hall near Bridgnorth
- Ironbridge Gorge Museum
- Morville Hall near Bridgnorth
- Sunnycroft at Wellington
- Town Walls Tower Shrewsbury
- Wilderhope Manor on Wenlock Edge

== Somerset ==
- Barrington Court
- Bath Assembly Rooms
- Brean Down
- Brean Down Fort
- Burrow Mump
- Cadbury Camp
- Cheddar Gorge
- Clevedon Court
- Coleridge Cottage
- Crook Peak to Shute Shelve Hill
- Dolebury Warren
- Dunster Castle
- Dunster Working Watermill
- Ebbor Gorge
- Fyne Court
- Glastonbury Tor
- Holnicote Estate
- King Alfred's Tower
- King John's Hunting Lodge
- Leigh Woods
- Lytes Cary Manor
- Montacute House
- The Priest's House, Muchelney
- Prior Park Landscape Garden
- Sand Point
- Solsbury Hill
- Stembridge Tower Mill
- Stoke sub Hamdon Priory
- Tintinhull Garden
- Treasurer's House
- Tyntesfield
- Walton and Ivythorn Hills
- Wellington Monument, Somerset
- West Pennard Court Barn
- Yarn Market, Dunster

== Staffordshire ==
- Biddulph Grange
- Downs Banks
- Kinver Edge
- Kinver Edge Hillfort
- Kniver Rock Houses
- Letocetum
- Mow Cop Castle
- Moseley Old Hall
- South Peak Estate
- Shugborough Hall

== Suffolk ==
- Angel Corner, Bury St Edmunds
- Bridge Cottage, Flatford
- Dunwich Heath
- Ickworth House
- Lavenham Guildhall
- Melford Hall
- Orford Ness
- Theatre Royal, Bury St Edmunds
- Sutton Hoo
- Thorington Hall

== Surrey ==
- Abinger Roughs and Netley Park, Abinger Hammer/Wotton
- Bookham Commons
- Box Hill
- Clandon House (Largely destroyed by fire)
- Claremont Landscape Garden
- Dapdune Wharf
- Hatchlands Park
- Hindhead Common
- The Homewood
- Hydon's Ball
- Leith Hill
- Oakhurst Cottage
- Polesden Lacey
- Reigate Hill and Gatton Park
- River Wey and Godalming Navigations
- Runnymede
- Shalford Mill
- Winkworth Arboretum
- The Witley Centre

== East Sussex ==
- Alfriston Clergy House
- Bateman's
- Birling Gap
- Bodiam Castle
- Lamb House
- Monk's House
- Sheffield Park and Garden
- Litlington White Horse

== West Sussex ==
- Cissbury Ring
- Devil's Dyke
- Harting Down
- Lavington Common
- Nymans
- Petworth House
- Standen
- Swan Barn Farm
- Uppark
- Wakehurst Place Garden
- Woolbeding Gardens

== Teesside ==
- Ormesby Hall

== Tyne and Wear ==
- Gibside
- Penshaw Monument
- Souter Lighthouse
- Washington Old Hall

== Warwickshire ==
- Baddesley Clinton
- Charlecote Park
- Coughton Court
- Farnborough Hall
- Kinwarton Dovecote
- Packwood House
- Upton House

== West Midlands ==
- Birmingham Back to Backs
- Roundhouse, Birmingham
- Wightwick Manor

== Wiltshire ==
- Avebury
- Avebury Manor & Garden
- Calstone and Cherhill Downs
- Cley Hill
- The Courts Garden
- Figsbury Ring
- Great Chalfield Manor
- Heelis
- Lacock Abbey, Fox Talbot Museum
- Little Clarendon, Dinton
- Mompesson House
- Pepperbox Hill
- Philipps House and Dinton Park
- Piggledene
- Stonehenge Landscape (formerly Stonehenge Down and Stonehenge Historic Landscape)
- Stourhead
- The Coombes
- Westwood Manor
- White Barrow

== Worcestershire ==
- Bredon Barn
- Croome Park
- The Firs (Elgar Birthplace Museum)
- The Fleece Inn
- The Greyfriars
- Hanbury Hall
- Hawford Dovecote
- Knowles Mill, Bewdley
- Middle Littleton Tythe Barn
- Rosedene, Chartist cottage
- Wichenford Dovecote

== East Riding of Yorkshire ==
- Maister House, Hull

== North Yorkshire ==
- Beningbrough Hall and gardens
- Braithwaite Hall
- Bridestones, Crosscliff and Blakey Topping
- Brimham Rocks
- Fountains Abbey and Studley Royal Water Garden
- Goddards House and Garden
- Malham Tarn Estate
- Middlethorpe Hall
- Moulton Hall
- Mount Grace Priory
- Nunnington Hall
- Ormesby Hall
- Rievaulx Terrace & Temples
- Robin Hood's Bay, Old Coastguard Station
- Roseberry Topping
- Treasurer's House
- Upper Wharfedale
- Yorkshire Coast

== South Yorkshire ==
- Wentworth Castle Gardens

== West Yorkshire ==
- East Riddlesden Hall
- Hardcastle Crags
- Longshaw Estate
- Marsden Moor Estate
- Nostell Priory

== See also ==
- List of National Trust properties in Wales
- List of National Trust properties in Northern Ireland
- List of National Trust for Scotland properties
- List of historic houses
- List of abbeys and priories
- List of castles
- List of museums
- List of Conservation topics
- List of National Trust land in England
- List of English Heritage properties
