= List of National Trust land in England =

This is a list of National Trust land in England. This is the land that is looked after by the National Trust and includes coast, countryside and heritage landscapes. This does not include National Trust properties, unless they contain significant estate land.

The list is subdivided using the National Trust's own system which divides England into nine regions. These are not the same as the official Regions of England.

The counties of England are divided up as follows:

- Devon & Cornwall
- East of England
  - Bedfordshire, Cambridgeshire, Essex, part of Hertfordshire, Norfolk, Suffolk
- East Midlands
  - Derbyshire, Leicestershire, S Lincolnshire, Northamptonshire, Nottinghamshire, Rutland
- North West
  - Cheshire, Cumbria, Greater Manchester, Lancashire, Merseyside
- South East
  - East Sussex, Kent, Surrey, West Sussex
- Thames & Solent
  - Berkshire, Buckinghamshire, Hampshire, Isle of Wight, Greater London, Oxfordshire
- West Midlands
  - Birmingham, Herefordshire, Shropshire, Staffordshire, Warwickshire, Worcestershire
- Wessex
  - Bristol / Bath, Dorset, Gloucestershire, Somerset, Wiltshire
- Yorkshire & North East
  - County Durham, N Lincolnshire, Newcastle & Tyneside, Northumberland, Teesside, Yorkshire

== Devon & Cornwall ==
Devon and Cornwall offer places of historic importance and outstanding natural beauty cared for by the National Trust, including:

- Much of the Devon and Cornwall coastline
- 3000 hectares of woodland
- 15,000 hectares of farmland
- 4000 hectares within Dartmoor and Exmoor National Parks

== East Midlands ==
Clumber Park

== North West ==
Greenhalgh Castle (Garstang Castle), Garstang.

== South East ==
The National Trust owns and looks after 29,000 hectares within this region.

Name	County	General Description	Area		Grid reference^{[A]}	Car park	National Trust Entry
Name	County	General Description	Hectares	Acres	Grid reference^{[A]}	Car park	National Trust Entry
Abinger Roughs, Piney Copse and Netley Park	Surrey	Woodland, heathland, scrubland			TQ135470	check	
Black Down and Marley Common	Sussex	Woodland, heathland, scrubland	391	965	SU919296	check	
Blackcap	Sussex	Grass downland, woodland			TQ375124	check	
Bookham Commons	Surrey	Grassland, meadows, woodland, scrub, ponds			TQ125565	check	
Box Hill	Surrey	Woodland, chalk escarpment	490	1200	TQ179511	check	
Cissbury Ring	Sussex	Chalk downland, hill fort			TQ141079	check	
Cuckmere Valley	Sussex	River estuary, farmland and woodland			TQ510009	check	
Denbies Hillside and White Down	Surrey	Woodland, chalk escarpment			TQ140502	check	
The Devil's Dyke and Fulking	Sussex	Woodland, chalkland			TQ263110	check	
The Ditchling Beacon and Ditchling Down	Sussex	Grass downland			TQ333131	check	
Drovers Estate	Sussex	Farmland, woodland, bridge			SU874142	☒	
East Head	Sussex	Sand and shingle spit			SZ767989	check	
Frensham Little Pond	Surrey	Heathland, woodland, pond	372	922	SU860415	check	
Harting Down	Sussex	Chalk downland, Iron Age hill fort, ponds			SU804177	check	
Headley Heath	Surrey	Heathland, woods			TQ200530	check	
Hindhead Commons and the Devil's Punch Bowl	Surrey	Woodland, heathland, springs	647.5	1600	SU895365	check	
Holmwood Common	Surrey	Woodland, common, ponds			TQ175455	check	
Hydon's Ball and Heath	Surrey	Woodland, heathland	51	126	SU977395	check	
Leith Hill	Surrey	Woodland, parkland, farmland, heath, tower			TQ140430	check	
Limpsfield Common and Harewoods	Surrey	Woodland, heath	137	240	TQ410525	check	
Reigate Hill and Gatton Park	Surrey	Escarpment			TQ260522	check	
Seven Sisters, Cuckmere Haven, Crowlink and Birling Gap	Sussex	Chalk downland			TV514980– TV551958	check	
Slindon Estate	Sussex	Downland, village, woodland, grassland			SU959071	check	
Witley Common and Milford Common	Surrey	Woodland, heathland			SU930410	check	

== Thames & Solent ==
The National Trust looks after countryside in the Thames & Solent region, including coastline on the Isle of Wight. 4

Name	County	General Description	Area		Grid reference^{[A]}	Car park	National Trust Entry
Name	County	General Description	Hectares	Acres	Grid reference^{[A]}	Car park	National Trust Entry
Afton Down, Compton Down and Brook Down	Isle of Wight	Chalk downland			SZ370856	check	
Ashdown Park & the Uffington White Horse	Oxfordshire	Gardens, parkland, woodland/Chalk downland, Iron Age hill fort	95 +202	235 +499	SU284823; SU293866	check	
The Ashridge Estate and Ivinghoe Beacon	Hertfordshire & Buckinghamshire	Woodland, commons, chalk downland	1821	4500	SP970131	check	
Bembridge Down and Culver Down	Isle of Wight	Chalk downland	42	104	SZ624860	check	
Borthwood Copse	Isle of Wight	Woodland			SZ570843	☒	
Bradenham	Buckinghamshire	Beech woodland, farmland, chalk grassland	449.5	1111	SU825970	check	
Bramshaw Commons	Hampshire	Heathland, commons	568	1404	SU285165	check	
Brookgreen	Isle of Wight	Village, chine, green			SZ386835	check	
The Buscot and Coleshill Estates	Oxfordshire	Villages, farms, woodland	3035	7500	SU266940; SU237972	check	
Chillerton Down	Isle of Wight	Chalk downland			SZ479835	☒	
Compton Bay	Isle of Wight	Beach, cliffs, chine			SZ370850	check	
Coombe Hill and Low Scrubs	Buckingham	Chalk downland/wooded common	68	213	SP849066	check	
Finchampstead Ridges and Simon’s Wood	Berkshire	Heathland, woodland	24	60	SU808634	check	
Hale Purlieu	Hampshire	Heathland, Forestry Commission plantation	207	512	SU200180	check	
The Hughenden Estate	Buckinghamshire	Parkland, woodland	270	668	SU866955	Near High Wycombe	
Lardon Chase, the Holies and Lough Down	Berkshire	Chalk grassland, Iron Age hill forts	27	67	SU588810	check	
Luccombe Chine, Luccombe Cliffs and Haddon's Pits	Isle of Wight	Chine, woodland, cliffs			SZ584797	☒	
Ludshott Common and Waggoners’ Wells	Hampshire	Heathland, ponds, woodland	285	705	SU855350	check	
Maidenhead Commons and Cock Marsh	Berkshire	Woodland, grassland, ponds, riverside, meadows	341	843	SU880860	check	
Newtown Estuary	Isle of Wight	River estuary, woodland, meadows, beach			SZ415910	check	
Nodes Point	Isle of Wight	Woodland, beach			SZ634906	☒	
Pulpit Wood	Buckinghamshire	Woodland, chalk grassland	26	65	SP832048	Near Whiteleaf Cross	
Runnymede	Surrey	Meadows, pastures, river, pond	74	183	TQ007720	check	
St Catherine’s: St. Catherine's Down and Knowles Farm	Isle of Wight	Scrubland, cliffs, chalk downland	109	270	SZ495755	check	
St Helens Duver	Isle of Wight	Scrubland, grassland, woodland			SZ636892	check	
Selborne Hill	Hampshire	Beech woodland	101	250	SU735333	☒	
Stockbridge Down	Hampshire	Chalk downland, Iron Age camp	65	165	SU379349	check	
Ventnor Downs: Bonchurch Down, Luccombe Down, St Boniface Down and Wroxall Down	Isle of Wight	Chalk downland, heathland	231	570	SZ570782	check	
Watlington Hill	Oxfordshire	Chalk downland, woodland	45	112	SU702935	check	
West Wight: Headon Warren, the Needles and Tennyson Down	Isle of Wight	Chalk downland, heathland, cliffs	186	459	SZ310851	check	
West Wycombe Hill	Buckinghamshire	Chalk grassland, woodland, cave, Iron Age hill fort, village	22	55	SU828947	check	

== West Midlands ==
The National Trust protects over 8,000 hectares of land in Warwickshire, Worcestershire, Shropshire, Staffordshire, Herefordshire and the West Midlands.

Name	County	General Description	Area		Grid reference^{[A]}	Car park	National Trust Entry
Name	County	General Description	Hectares	Acres	Grid reference^{[A]}	Car park	National Trust Entry
Downs Banks	Staffordshire	Grassland and woodland	67	166	SJ900364	check	
Hawksmoor	Staffordshire	Woodland	121	300	SK039442	check	
Toothill Woods	Staffordshire	Woodland	4	10	SK067425	check	

== Wessex ==
The National Trust cares for and protects large areas of countryside throughout Wessex.

== See also ==
- List of National Trust properties in England
- List of National Trust properties in Wales
- List of National Trust properties in Northern Ireland
- List of National Trust for Scotland properties
- List of Conservation topics
