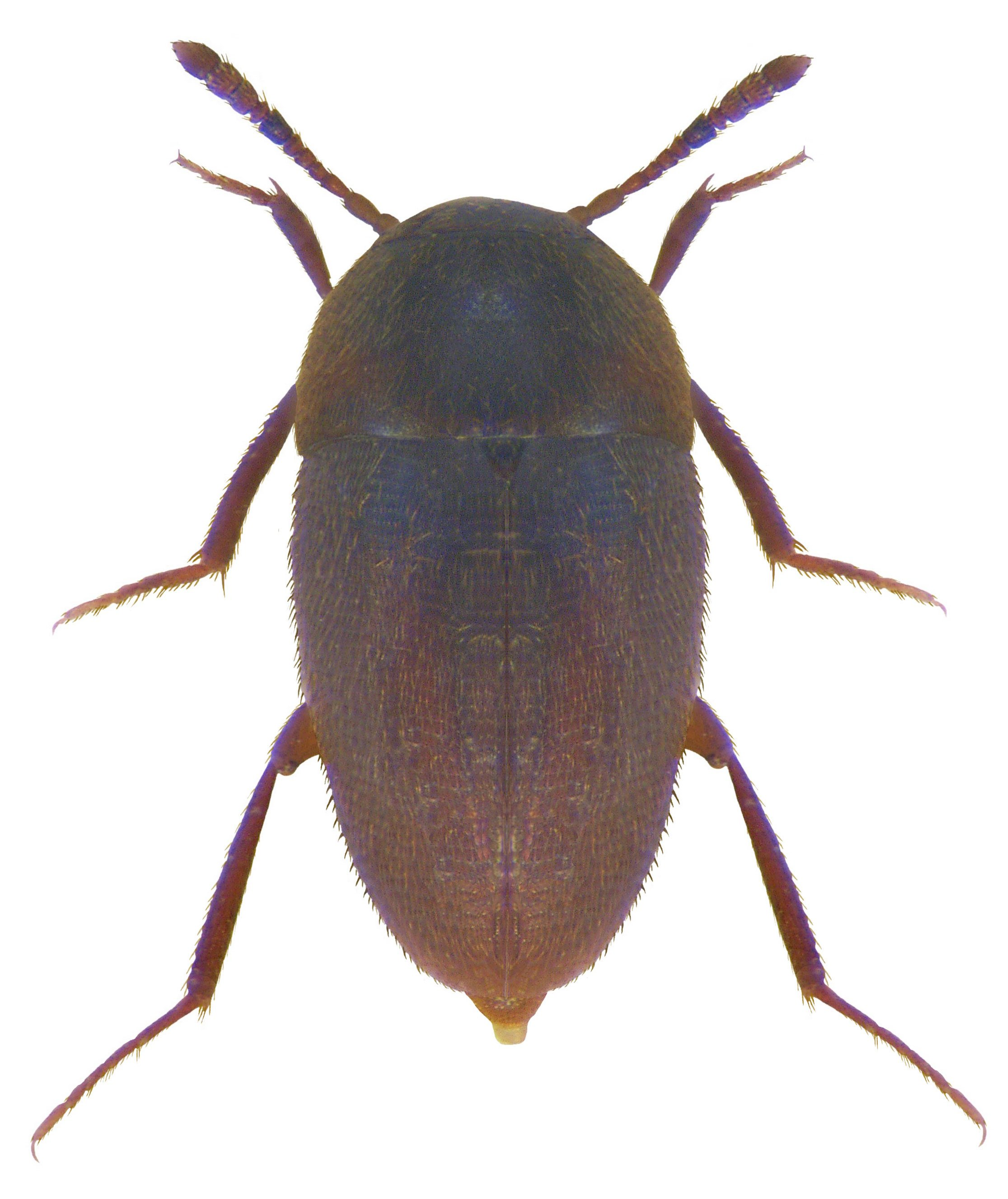
- Nemadus colonoides

Scientific classification
- Domain: Eukaryota
- Kingdom: Animalia
- Phylum: Arthropoda
- Class: Insecta
- Order: Coleoptera
- Suborder: Polyphaga
- Infraorder: Staphyliniformia
- Family: Leiodidae
- Subfamily: Cholevinae
- Tribe: Anemadini

Subtribes
- Eocatopina Jeannel, 1936; Eunemadina Newton, 1998; Nemadina Jeannel, 1936

= Anemadini =

Tribe of beetles

Anemadini is a tribe of small carrion beetles in the family Leiodidae. There are at least 30 genera and more than 70 described species in Anemadini.

== Genera ==
These 30 genera belong to the tribe Anemadini:

- Anemadiola Szymczakowski, 1963
- Anemadus Reitter, 1884
- Araucaniopsis Salgado Costas, 2005
- Austrocholeva Zwick, 1979
- Austronargus Zwick, 1979
- Austronemadus Zwick, 1979
- Catoposchema Jeannel, 1936
- Cholevodes Portevin, 1928
- Dissochaetus Reitter, 1884
- Eocatops Peyerimhoff, 1924
- Eunemadus Portevin, 1914
- Falkocholeva Hatch, 1928
- Falkonemadus Szymczakowski, 1961
- Mesocolon Broun, 1880
- Micronemadus Jeannel, 1936
- Nargiotes Jeannel, 1936
- Nargomorphus Jeannel, 1936
- Nemadiolus Jeannel, 1936
- Nemadiopsis Jeannel, 1936
- Nemadotropis Szymczakowski, 1971
- Nemadus Thomson, 1867
- Neoeocatops Peck & Cook, 2007
- Newtoniopsis Salgado Costas, 2005
- Paracatops Portevin, 1907
- Paranemadus Zwick, 1979
- Peckardia Salgado Costas, 2005
- Pseudonargiotes Salgado Costas, 2005
- Pseudonemadus Portevin, 1914
- Rangiola Jeannel, 1936
- Speonemadus Jeannel, 1922
