= Rosa × bengyana =

Scientific classification
- Kingdom: Plantae
- Clade: Tracheophytes
- Clade: Angiosperms
- Clade: Eudicots
- Clade: Rosids
- Order: Rosales
- Family: Rosaceae
- Genus: Rosa
- Species: R. × bengyana

Binomial name
- Rosa × bengyana Rouy & L.C.Lamb.

Hybrid species of flowering plant

Rosa × bengyana is a hybrid species of flowering plant in the rose family, Rosaceae. It belongs to the genus Rosa and is a shrub that grows in temperate regions. Its native range is the United Kingdom. The hybrid originated from a cross between Rosa rubiginosa and Rosa stylosa. The hybrid formula is R. rubiginosa × R. stylosa.

== Taxonomy ==
Rosa × bengyana has had a relatively simple taxonomic history. Most botanists have recognized it under the name Rosa × bengyana, although some authors have treated it as a variety of the hybrid Rosa × longicolla. As a result, it has one homotypic synonym, Rosa × longicolla var. bengyana.
