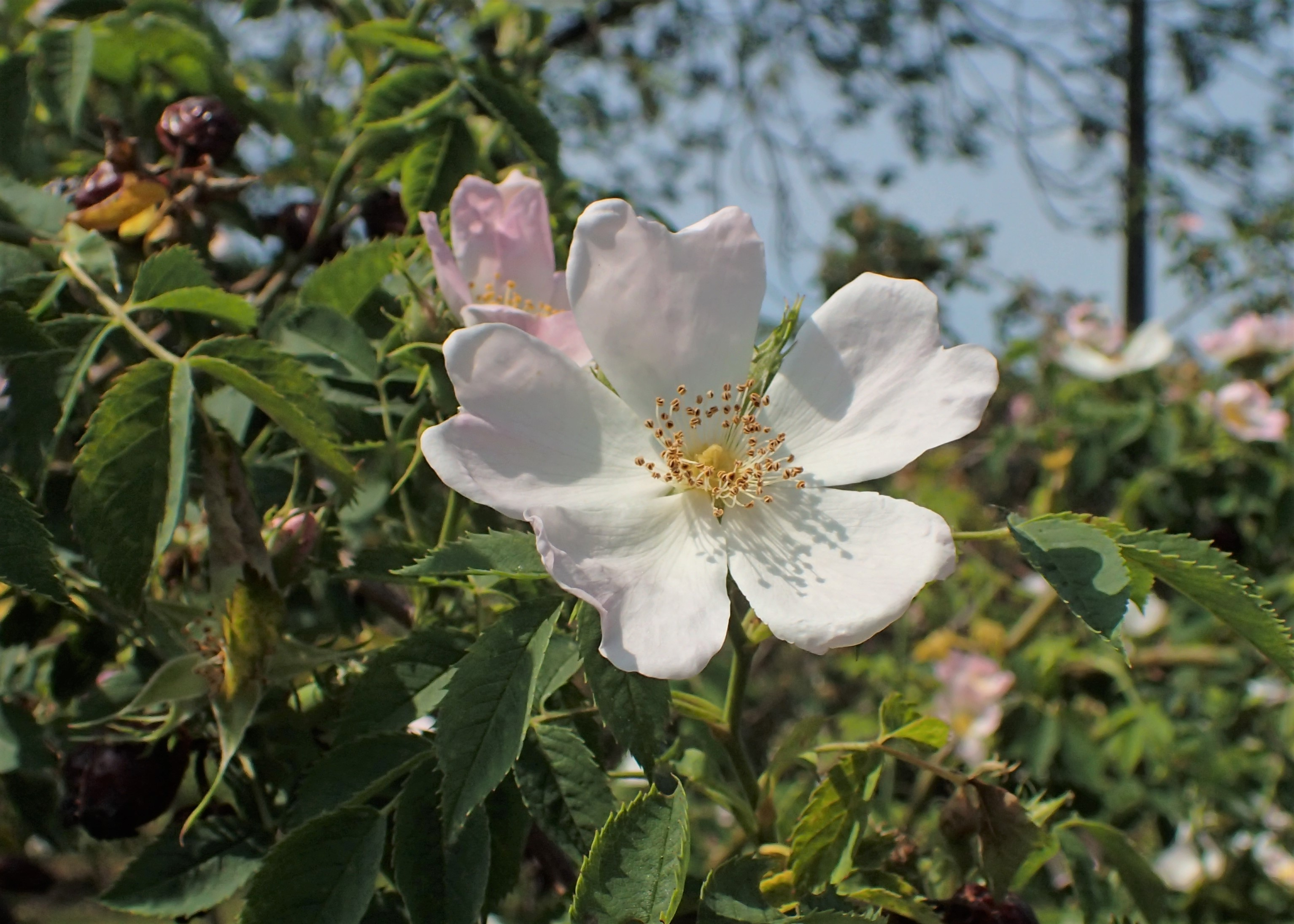

Scientific classification
- Kingdom: Plantae
- Clade: Tracheophytes
- Clade: Angiosperms
- Clade: Eudicots
- Clade: Rosids
- Order: Rosales
- Family: Rosaceae
- Genus: Rosa
- Species: R. × andegavensis

Binomial name
- Rosa × andegavensis Bastard

Synonyms
- List: Rosa × leucochroa Desv.; Rosa × leucochroa var. angusta Desv.; Rosa brevistyla var. leucochroa (Desv.) DC.; Rosa × leucochroa var. rosea Desv.; Rosa canina var. rotundifolia Ser.; Rosa stylosa var. leucochroa (Desv.) Ser.; Rosa canina subsp. andegavensis (Bastard) N.H.F.Desp.; Rosa canina var. andegavensis (Bastard) N.H.F.Desp.; Rosa scandens var. leucochroa (Desv.) Wallr.; Rosa systyla var. leucochroa (Desv.) W.D.J.Koch; Rosa canina hirtella Gren.; Rosa canina f. andegavensis (Bastard) Rapin; Rosa × andegavensis hirtella (Gren.) Ducommun; Rosa × andegavensis rotundifolia (Ser.) Ducommun; Rosa × histricosa Crép.; Rosa × transmota Crép.; Rosa canina andegavensis (Bastard) Crép.; Rosa × andegavensis var. leiostyla Gren.; Rosa × andegavensis var. trichostyla Gren.; Rosa × jurana Déségl.; Rosa × multivaga Déségl.; Rosa propinqua Déségl.; Crepinia × andegavensis (Bastard) Gand.; Rosa × andegavensis var. purpurata J.B.Keller; Rosa × andegavensis var. vixhispida Christ ex J.B.Keller; Rosa × psilophylloides Crép. ex Halácsy & Heinr.Braun; Rosa × superba J.Kern. & J.B.Keller; Rosa × transmota var. germanica Dolliner ex J.B.Keller; Rosa × andegavensis f. ciliatopetala Chast.; Rosa × andegavensis subf. leiopoda J.B.Keller & Formánek; Rosa × andegavensis f. macranthoides Chast.; Rosa × andegavensis f. pseudopsilophylla Chast.; Rosa × andegavensis f. germanica (Dolliner ex J.B.Keller) Heinr.Braun; Rosa × andegavensis var. superba (J.Kern. & J.B.Keller) Heinr.Braun; Rosa × andegavensis var. transmota (Crép.) Heinr.Braun; Rosa × andegavensis var. typica Heinr.Braun; Rosa × andegavensis f. salicetorum Heinr.Braun; Rosa communis var. andegavensis (Bastard) Rouy & E.G.Camus; Rosa communis var. histricosa (Crép.) Rouy & E.G.Camus; Rosa communis var. leucochroa (Desv.) Rouy & E.G.Camus; Rosa × waitziana var. transmota (Crép.) Rouy & E.G.Camus; Rosa canina subvar. cernagorae R.Keller; Rosa canina subvar. transmota (Crép.) R.Keller; Rosa stylosa subvar. leucochroa (Desv.) R.Keller; Rosa × andegavensis var. rotundifolia (Ser.) Hayek; Rosa lutetiana var. andegavensis (Bastard) Wolley-Dod; Rosa stylosa f. leucochroa (Desv.) Wolley-Dod; Rosa × andegavensis var. cernagorae (R.Keller) Hayek; Rosa canina var. leucochroa (Desv.) Boulenger; Rosa pouzinii var. histricosa (Crép.) Rouy ex C.Vicioso; Rosa pouzinii var. histricosa (Crép.) Rouy ex C.Vicioso; Rosa × litvinovii Chrshan.; Rosa × litvinovii var. berehowiensis Chrshan.; Rosa × litvinovii var. pennata Chrshan.; Rosa × andegavensis f. leiopoda (J.B.Keller & Formánek) Vukić.

= Rosa × andegavensis =

Nothospecies of flowering plant

Rosa × andegavensis is a hybrid rose belonging to the family Rosaceae. It was formed through a natural cross between Rosa canina and Rosa stylosa giving it the hybrid formula Rosa canina × Rosa stylosa. The species is native to parts of Western Europe and Morocco. It has also been introduced to Albania, Lebanon, and Syria.

== Taxonomy ==
This hybrid species has over 50 accepted synonyms, including a number of varieties and alternative scientific names that have been used throughout its taxonomic history.

== Description ==
Rosa × andegavensis is a deciduous shrub similar to Rosa canina and Rosa squarrosa.
