= Bookham Commons =

Areas of common land in Surrey, England

Coordinates: 51.29646°N 0.38352°W

- Site of Special Scientific Interest
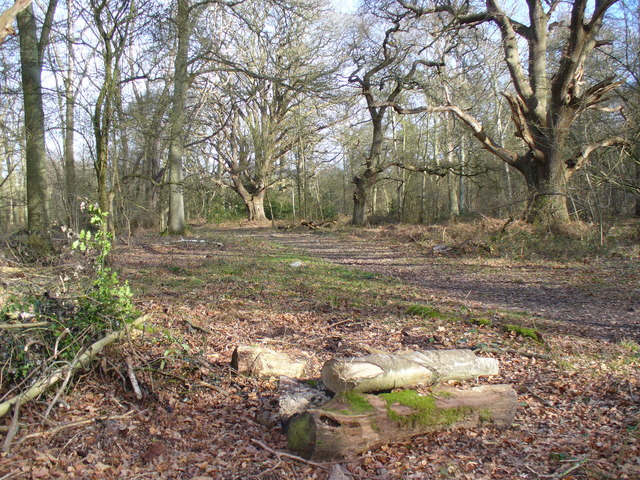
- Location of Bookham Commons.
- Area of search: Surrey
- Grid reference: TQ 128 564
- Interest: Biological
- Area: 154.7 hectares (382 acres)
- Notification date: 1985
- Location map: Magic Map

Bookham Commons are two commons, situated just to the north of the villages of Great Bookham and Little Bookham, in Surrey, England, 154.7 hectares (382 acres) in extent; the individual parts are named Great Bookham Common and Little Bookham Common. A group of dwellings known as the Isle of Wight is situated within the site, and a track, Common Road, leads to it from the northwest. Little Bookham Common (the smaller of the two parts of the site) lies south and west of this track, whereas Great Bookham Common lies to the east.

Together the two commons comprise a Site of Special Scientific Interest.

The Commons are mentioned in the Doomsday Book.

The site is owned by the National Trust. A network of public footpaths and public bridleways cross the site: in addition, there are a number of concessionary horse rides.

== Site description ==
The site sits on London Clay. Habitat types present include woodland, scrub, grassland and open water.

Woodland covers approximately two-thirds of the site. The majority of this woodland is mature and dominated by pedunculate oak (Quercus robur). These woodlands are dissected by a network of rides.

Little Bookham Common is a mosaic of rough grassland and scrub; much of this common is poorly drained and there are several old gunpits and bomb craters. The areas of open grassland are dominated by tufted hair-grass (Deschampsia cespitosa).

There are several woodland ponds on the site and a tributary of the River Mole runs across it.

== Biodiversity interest ==
The site's nature conservation importance (the reason for SSSI designation), is due to its plant communities, its community of breeding birds and its invertebrate communities.

Thin-spiked wood sedge (Carex strigosa), which is scarce in Surrey, is present in woodlands at the site. Two species of rose which are scarce in Surrey, Rosa micrantha and Rosa stylosa are found in the scrub on Little Bookham Common. The bryophyte flora in the site's woodland is rich and includes one of only two Surrey localities for the moss Zygodon conoideus. Notable plants found in the grassland of Little Bookham Common include southern marsh-orchid (Dactylorhiza praetermissa), pepper-saxifrage (Silaum silaus), spiked sedge (Carex spicata) and adder’s-tongue fern (Ophioglossum vulgatum). The flora of the site's open water habitats includes three plants which are scarce in Surrey: greater duckweed (Lemna polyrhiza), fat duckweed (Lemna gibba) and thread-leaved water-crowfoot (Ranunculus trichophyllus), while tall-herb fen communities here support two plants which are rare in Surrey, the grass orange foxtail (Alopecurus aequalis) and eared willow (Salix aurita).

Breeding birds which are associated with woodland at this site include hawfinch, woodcock and lesser spotted woodpecker, whilst those breeding in scrub areas include nightingale and grasshopper warbler.

The site has a well-recorded invertebrate fauna, which includes 611 species of beetle, 1140 species of fly, 146 true bugs, 201 spiders, 17 dragonflies and over 300 species of butterflies and moths.

Dead oak trees provide habitat for several beetles which are scarce in Surrey including Nemadus colonoides and Aridius nodifer. Two moths which occur, the toadflax brocade and the broad-bordered bee hawkmoth are nationally rare. This is a well-known site for the purple emperor, and other scarce butterflies which are present include white-letter and purple hairstreaks and the white admiral.
