= Nemadus hornii =

Scientific classification
- Kingdom: Animalia
- Phylum: Arthropoda
- Class: Insecta
- Order: Coleoptera
- Suborder: Polyphaga
- Infraorder: Staphyliniformia
- Family: Leiodidae
- Genus: Nemadus
- Species: N. hornii

Binomial name
- Nemadus hornii Hatch, 1933

Synonyms
- Nemadus ellipticus Jeannel, 1936

Species of beetle

Nemadus hornii is a species of small carrion beetle in the family Leiodidae. It is found in North America.
