= Nemadus triangulum =

Scientific classification
- Kingdom: Animalia
- Phylum: Arthropoda
- Class: Insecta
- Order: Coleoptera
- Suborder: Polyphaga
- Infraorder: Staphyliniformia
- Family: Leiodidae
- Genus: Nemadus
- Species: N. triangulum

Binomial name
- Nemadus triangulum Jeannel, 1936

Synonyms
- Nemadus obliquus Fall, 1937

Species of beetle

Nemadus triangulum is a species in the family Leiodidae ("round fungus beetles"), in the order Coleoptera ("beetles"). It is found in North America.
