= Nemadus pusio =

Scientific classification
- Kingdom: Animalia
- Phylum: Arthropoda
- Class: Insecta
- Order: Coleoptera
- Suborder: Polyphaga
- Infraorder: Staphyliniformia
- Family: Leiodidae
- Genus: Nemadus
- Species: N. pusio

Binomial name
- Nemadus pusio (LeConte, 1859)

Synonyms
- Catops pusio LeConte, 1859

Species of beetle

Nemadus pusio is a species of small carrion beetle in the family Leiodidae. It is found in North America.
