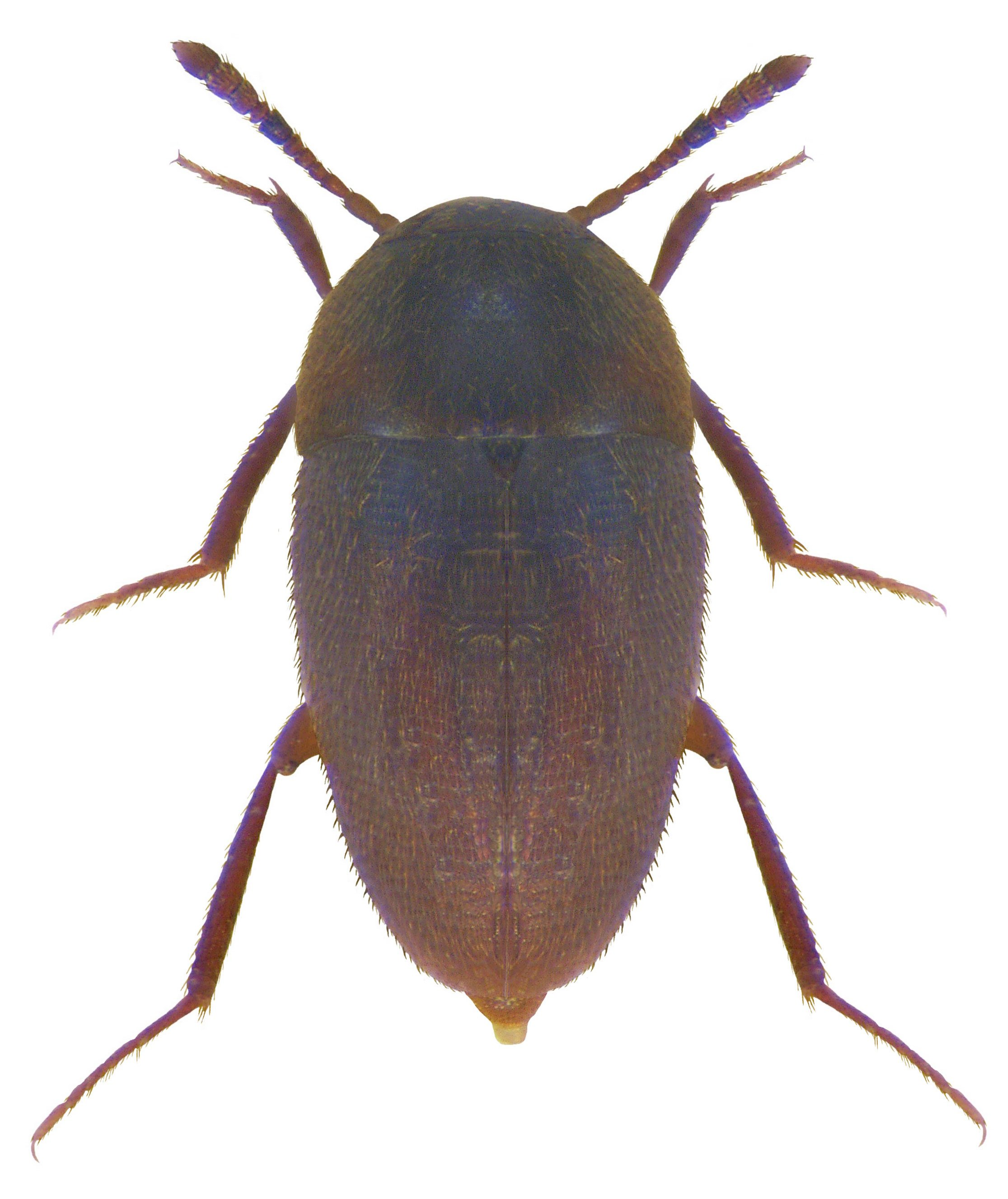
- Nemadus colonoides

Scientific classification
- Kingdom: Animalia
- Phylum: Arthropoda
- Class: Insecta
- Order: Coleoptera
- Suborder: Polyphaga
- Infraorder: Staphyliniformia
- Family: Leiodidae
- Subfamily: Cholevinae
- Tribe: Anemadini
- Subtribe: Nemadina
- Genus: Nemadus; Thomson, 1867

= Nemadus =

Genus of beetles

Nemadus is a genus of small carrion beetles in the family Leiodidae.

== Selected species ==
- Nemadus brachyderus (LeConte, 1863)
- Nemadus browni Peck and Cook, 2007
- Nemadus colonoides (Kraatz, 1851)
- Nemadus criddlei Peck and Cook, 2007
- Nemadus falli Peck and Cook, 2007
- Nemadus gracilicornis Fall, 1937
- Nemadus hornii Hatch, 1933
- Nemadus integer Fall, 1937
- Nemadus myrmecophilus Jeannel, 1936
- Nemadus parasitus (LeConte, 1853)
- Nemadus pusio (LeConte, 1859)
- Nemadus tenuitarsis Jeannel, 1936
- Nemadus triangulum Jeannel, 1936
