= Watershoot Bay =

Coordinates: 50°34′34″N 1°18′22″W

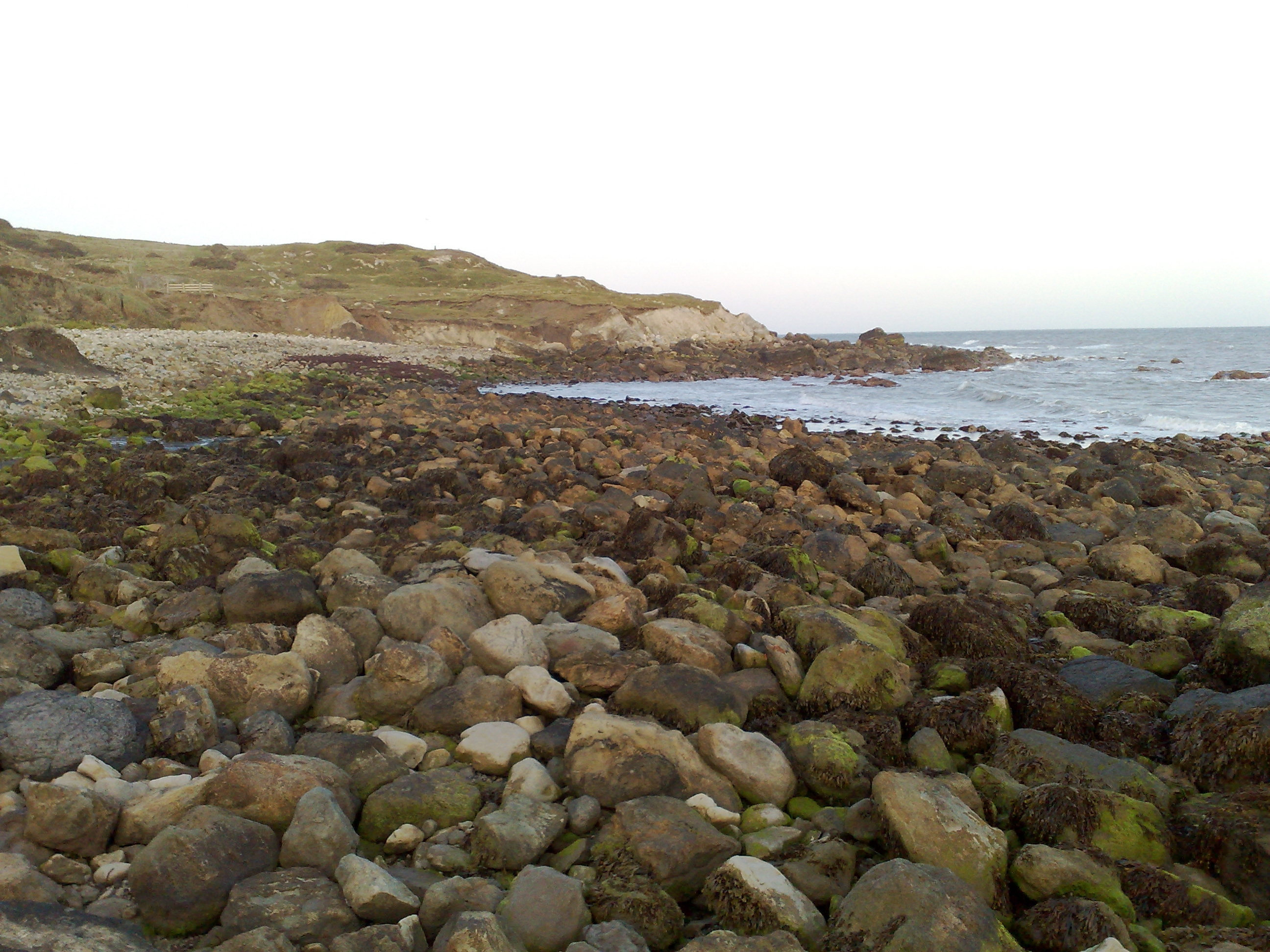
- Watershoot Bay looking to the East

- Location within the Isle of Wight
- Civil parish: Niton and Whitwell
- Ceremonial county: Isle of Wight
- Region: South East
- Country: England
- Sovereign state: United Kingdom

Watershoot Bay is a bay on the southernmost tip of the Isle of Wight, England. It lies 1 1/2 miles (2.4 km) to the south-west of the village of Niton. It faces south out into the English Channel, and is one of the smallest and remotest bays of the Isle of Wight with a rocky shoreline only around 500 feet (150 m) in length. It lies to the west of St. Catherine's Point lighthouse and is surrounded by a 170-acre area of undulating grassland and scrub owned by the National Trust and known as Knowles Farm.

The beach is composed predominantly of sandstone, chalk and chert boulders (which are around 90 to 110 million years old) which are rich in fossils.

The bay is best accessed from the car park about 350 yards (320 m) to the north or from the road that leads to the lighthouse but will involve a hike over rough terrain.

The name of the bay may have come from that of a sloop lost there in 1755. The bay was home to a boathouse from the mid-19th century to the early 20th century.
