= Nemadus brachyderus =

Scientific classification
- Kingdom: Animalia
- Phylum: Arthropoda
- Class: Insecta
- Order: Coleoptera
- Suborder: Polyphaga
- Infraorder: Staphyliniformia
- Family: Leiodidae
- Subfamily: Cholevinae
- Genus: Nemadus
- Species: N. brachyderus

Binomial name
- Nemadus brachyderus (LeConte, 1863)

Synonyms
- Catops brachyderus LeConte, 1863

Species of beetle

Nemadus brachyderus is a species of small carrion beetle in the family Leiodidae. It is found in North America.
