= Woolbury =

Iron Age hillfort in Hampshire, England

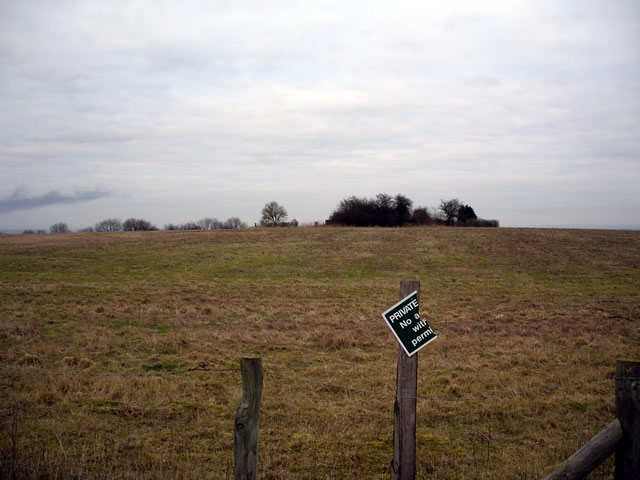
- Woolbury Ring

- Location within Hampshire
- 51.1157°N 1.4571°W
- Periods: Iron Age
- Location: Hampshire

Site notes
- Area: 16 acres (6.5 ha)
- Public access: part National Trust, part private land

Scheduled monument
- Official name: Woolbury Ring, Stockbridge
- Reference no.: 1003531

Woolbury, or Woolbury Ring, is the site of an Iron Age univallate hillfort on Stockbridge Down, Hampshire, England.

== Description ==
The site is described as a strong hilltop camp covering 20 acres (8.1 ha), with a single bank and ditch, and has commanding views over the surrounding area. The bank and ditch are well preserved to the west, the bank being 9 ft (2.7 m) high and 16 ft (4.9 m) above the bottom of the ditch. The eastern side has been ploughed out, and the ditch only remains to the north and south. The entrance is on the western side; the interior is down to permanent pasture. Only the southwest rampart (which includes the original entrance) is in National Trust ownership; the rest is private land.

The site is designated as a scheduled monument.

There are a number of other archaeological sites in the area, including a Bronze Age bowl barrow mound of approximately 130 ft (40 m) in diameter and 4 ft 11 in (1.5 m) in height at grid reference SU395363 and recorded in an Anglo-Saxon charter as Heardulfe's Hlaewe or Heardulfe's Barrow. The area is now subject to ploughing. In addition, several other tumuli are to be found south of the hillfort.

== Location ==
The site is at grid reference SU381353, east of the village of Stockbridge, in the county of Hampshire. Danebury hillfort lies close by to the west, over the River Test. The hill has a summit of 518 ft (158 m) above ordnance datum (AOD).

== White horse and cross ==
On the southern ramparts of Woolbury Ring is a hill figure of a horse. Whilst there are 17 white horse hill figures in England, with nine being nearby in Wiltshire, this is the only example in Hampshire. The horse was constructed crudely of rough flints, painted white and pushed into the ground to form the shape of the horse. The earliest documentation of the horse is in 1846. The horse for many years was covered by the surrounding bushes but in 1999, the site was cleared so the horse become visible again.

There was also a hill figure of a cross nearby, only a few yards from Winchester Road, constructed using the same method. This was lost in 1944.

== See also ==
- List of places in Hampshire
- List of hillforts in England
