= Witley Camp =

British World War I army training camp

Coordinates: 51°09′14″N 0°40′30″W

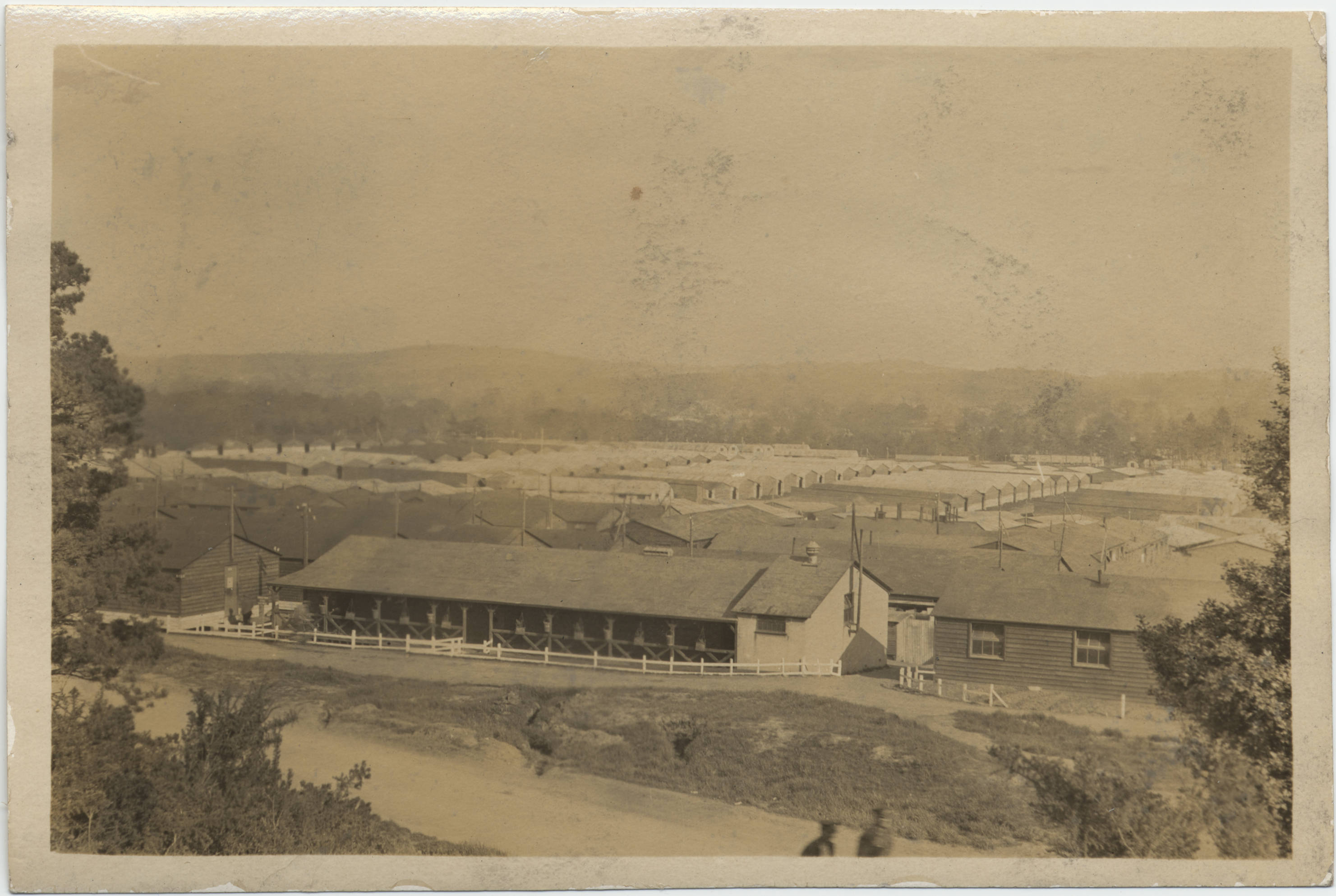
Witley Camp 1917/1918

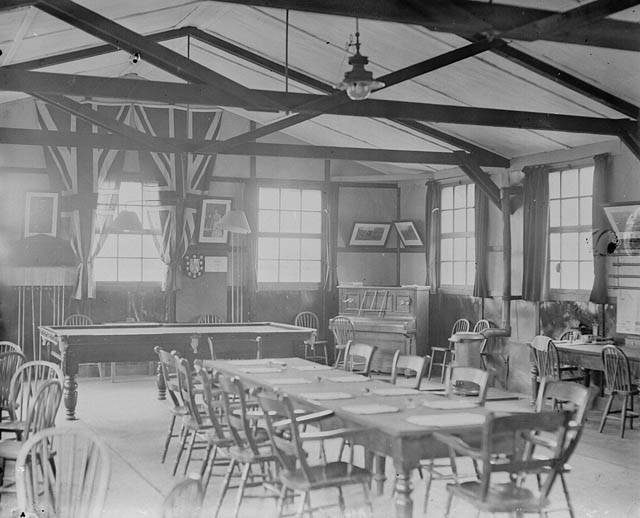
Canteen c.1916

Witley Military Camp, often simplified to Camp Witley, was a temporary army camp set up on Witley Common, Surrey, England during both the First and Second World Wars. The camp was about 40 mi (64 km) southwest of London.

The camp was the scene of riots after the Armistice but before troops were demobilized and returned to Canada.

Camp Witley was one of three facilities in the Aldershot Command area established by the Canadian Army; the others being Bordon and Bramshott (near Liphook).

Wilfred Owen penned a prelude to his "Anthem for Doomed Youth" whilst stationed at the camp.

Witley Camp was the headquarters of the Polish Resettlement Corps.
