= Stagshaw Garden =

Woodland garden in Cumbria, England

Coordinates: 54.4182°N 2.9561°W

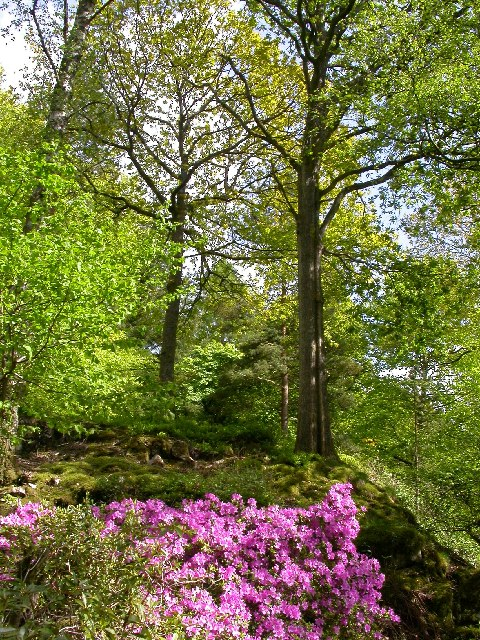
Blooming azaleas in Stagshaw Garden

Stagshaw Garden is a woodland garden situated south of Ambleside, in Cumbria, England, and in the ownership of the National Trust.

The garden is noted for its shrubs, including rhododendrons, azaleas and camellias.
