= Blakey Topping standing stones =

Standing stones in North Yorkshire, England

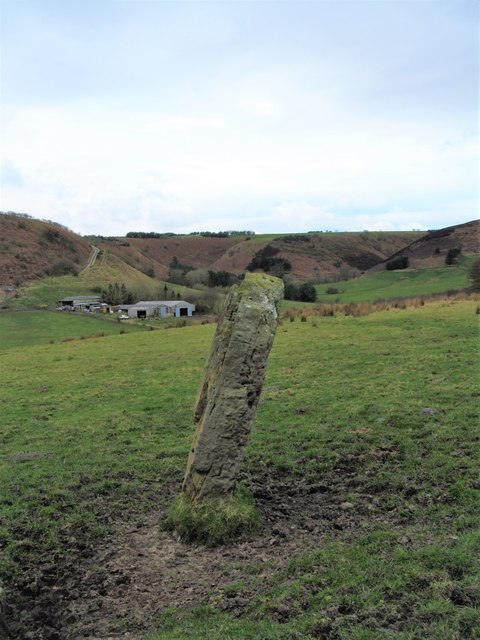
- One of the stones

- Location within North Yorkshire
- 54°19′43″N 0°39′39″W
- Location: North York Moors

Blakey Topping standing stones is a small group of standing stones near the Hole of Horcum in the North York Moors. It sits at the foot of Blakey Topping hill.

There are at least four standing stones currently surviving in this group, although some of them are of uncertain status. The tallest stone is 1.9 metres high and is much-weathered and leaning. A second stone is 1.0 metres high and appears to have had its top broken off. A third stone is 1.3 metres high but has been roughly squared off and is currently being used as a gate post. A fourth stone, 1.4 metres high, is found in an old field bank and is much-weathered and leaning. A fifth standing stone may exist, and two or three hollows in the ground may indicate the former position of other stones.

The stones may be the remains of a stone circle of about 17 metres in diameter. Alternatively, the stones may have formed part of a curving alignment or possibly two parallel rows.
