= Rosetta Cottage =

British Historic Building

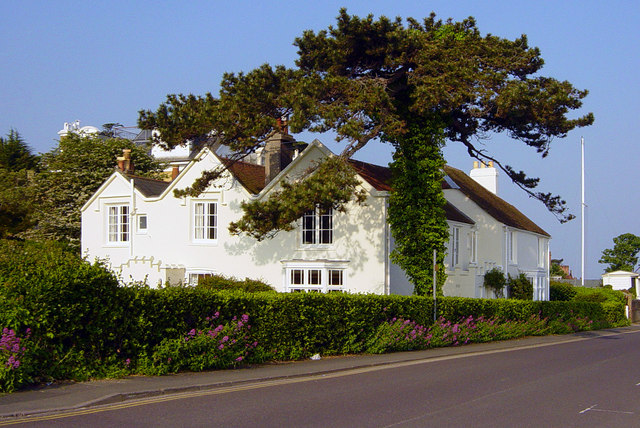

- Location within Isle of Wight and the United Kingdom

General information
- Location: 57 Queen's Rd; Cowes, Isle of Wight, PO31 8BW
- Coordinates: 50.7671°N 1.3112°W
- Owner: National Trust

Other information
- Number of rooms: 24 (14 Rosetta, 10 East Rosetta)

Rosetta Cottage, is a Victorian manor house situated in Cowes, Isle of Wight. Initially a single residence, it now consists of two smaller holiday homes, Rosetta Cottage, and East Rosetta Cottage, both of which are owned and operated by the National Trust.

It is notable for being the location of the marriage proposal between Lord Randolph Churchill and Jennie Jerome, the parents of future prime minister Winston Churchill.

== Association with the Churchill family ==
In 1873, the American financier Leonard Jerome rented Rosetta for the duration of the annual Cowes Week regatta, which he and his daughter Jennie had travelled to spectate. In a matter of days, she had accepted the proposal of Lord Randolph Churchill in the garden of Rosetta. Their firstborn child was Winston Churchill who went on to become the prime minister of the United Kingdom during the Second World War, and as a result Rosetta has become a significant cultural location.

The engagement between Randolph Churchill and Jerome, and the birth of Winston Churchill are commemorated on a plaque in the pavement opposite the Rosetta. It also claims that Lord and Lady Churchill met at Rosetta, although this is disputed and likely occurred at a party in the days before. A separate plaque can be found on the nearby seafront commemorates that as their true meeting place.

In 2016, Rosetta was one of twelve sites included in the Isle of Wight tourist board's 'Churchill Trail', an island-wide tour of sites they argue were important in the development of Winston Churchill's leadership skills.

== National Trust Ownership ==
On the Trust's Acorn Rating System for a property's facilities, Rosetta Cottage received a 4/5, and East Rosetta Cottage received a 3/5.
