= Piggledene =

Protected area in Wiltshire, England

Coordinates: 51.41894°N 1.79862°W

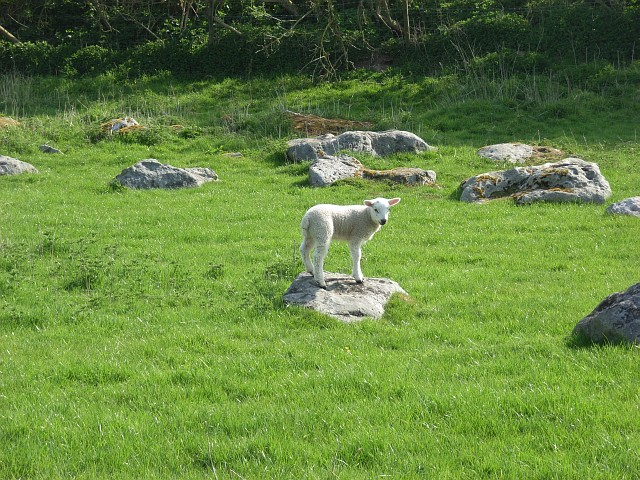
Lamb and sarsens, Piggle Dean

Piggledene (grid reference SU141689) is a 4.7 hectare biological and geological Site of Special Scientific Interest in Wiltshire, England, notified in 1965. Since 1908 it has been owned by the National Trust. In the vernacular, it is also known as the River of Stones.

Piggledene (sometimes spelled Piggle Dean) is a dry, shallow valley within the local chalk deposits. The area is known for its geomorphological and biological characteristics and is within the North Wessex Downs national landscape. The area contains hundreds of sarsen stones covered with lichens, similar to those found at Fyfield Down. The abundance of glacial erratic stones were transported laterally during periglacial conditions, forming a sarsen "valley train". In addition to lichens, the stones form a support for a variety of rare mosses, including Grimmia decipiens, Hedwigia ciliata, and Grimmia trichophylla. The sarsen stones in this area are also called "Grey Wethers" as they appear to be a flock of sheep from a distance.

== Sources ==
- Natural England citation sheet for the site (accessed 11 April 2022)
