= Lock Cottage =

Cottage in Oxford, England

Coordinates: 51°40′52″N 1°40′07″W

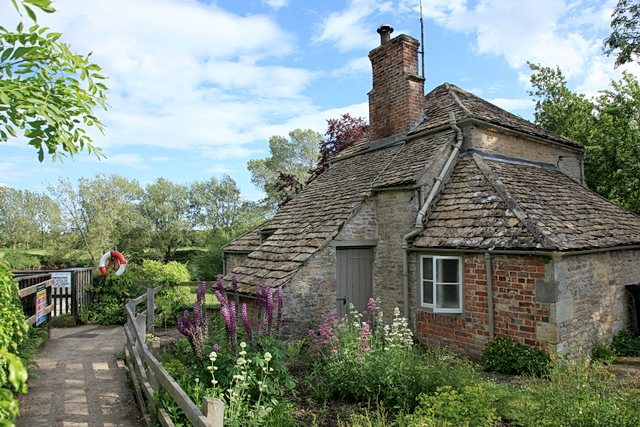
- Lock Cottage, Buscot

General information
- Type: Cottage
- Location: Buscot, Oxfordshire, England
- Completed: 1791
- Owner: In the care of the National Trust

Website
- www.nationaltrust.org.uk/holidays/oxfordshire-buckinghamshire-berkshire/lock-cottage

Listed Building – Grade II

Lock Cottage is a late 18th century, grade II listed lock keeper's cottage on Buscot Lock, the smallest lock on the Thames, in Buscot, Oxfordshire. It was built by Edward Loveden Loveden and is owned by the National Trust.

== History ==
Lock Cottage was built around 1791. The original building was a square, two-storey block, located on a small peninsula next to a weir at Buscot on the River Thames. It was built to house a relief lock keeper, after Loveden, owner of Buscot Park, had "headed a commission to improve the navigation of the upper Thames." Loveden, as president of the committee, became known as "Old Father Thames" for this work. The first lock keeper to live there was Robert Gearing.

The keeper's role was two-fold: collecting tolls (Loveden "made a fortune" from toll fees) and looking after three fishtanks, described as a "fish-house which cannot be robbed", located on the north side of the house. These tanks supplied Buscot Park with a steady supply of fish for the kitchens.

Buscot Park, including Lock Cottage, was bequeathed to the National Trust by philanthropist and businessman Edward Cook in 1955. New accommodation, "New Lock House," was built for the lock keeper in 1971. Since 1988, Lock Cottage has been run as a National Trust holiday cottage. The cottage received a grade II listing in 1990.
