= One Tree Hill and Bitchet Common =

Protected area in Kent, England

Coordinates: 51.258°N 0.244°E

- Site of Special Scientific Interest
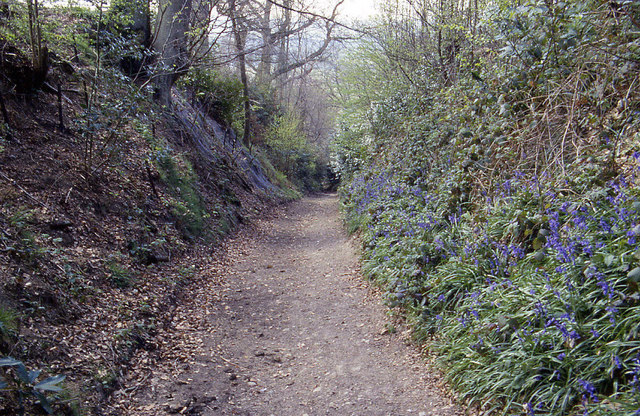
- Location of One Tree Hill and Bitchet Common.
- Area of search: Kent
- Grid reference: TQ 567 534
- Interest: Biological
- Area: 79.2 hectares (196 acres)
- Notification date: 1990
- Location map: Magic Map

One Tree Hill and Bitchet Common is a 79.2-hectare (196-acre) biological Site of Special Scientific Interest east of Sevenoaks in Kent. It is in Kent Downs Area of Outstanding Natural Beauty and One Tree Hill is managed by the National Trust

This site has mixed woodland on the Lower Greensand, some of it of ancient origin. The habitats are varied, including acidic soils on Bitchet Common and damp, base-rich soils in Martins Wood. There are several rare plants and invertebrates.

The site is in several blocks crossed by public footpaths.
