= Little Clarendon =

Country house in Norfolk, England

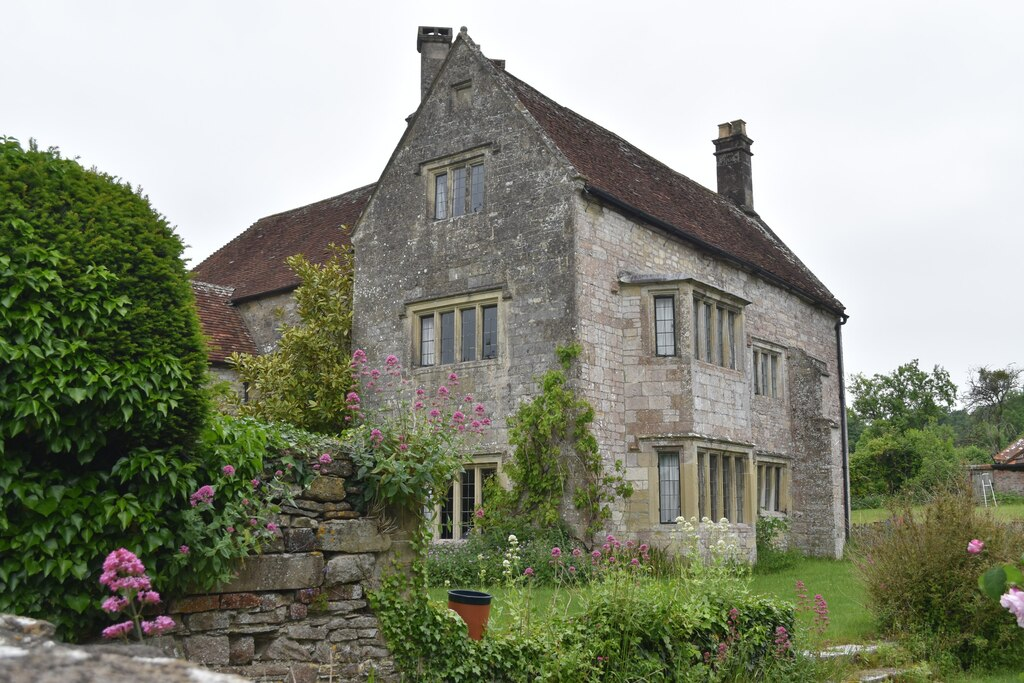
- Little Clarendon
- Interactive map of the Little Clarendon area

General information
- Architectural style: Tudor
- Location: Dinton, Wiltshire, England
- Coordinates: 51°05′00″N 1°58′49″W
- Owner: National Trust

Website
- www.nationaltrust.org.uk/visit/wiltshire/little-clarendon

Listed Building – Grade II*

Little Clarendon, also known as Coombes Land, is a 15th-century Tudor manor house in Dinton, Wiltshire, England. It has been owned by the National Trust since 1940.

== History ==
Little Clarendon was built of Chilmark stone in the late 15th century. Edward Combe probably purchased Little Clarendon from John and Michael Willoughby in 1593. In the 17th century, the manor's owners included Thomas Combe, Nicholas Daniell and Henry Hayter of Clarendon Park, who bought it in 1697. It was altered in the 17th century. In 1822 the house was inherited by William Maslen Barnes, who left it to his great-nephew Henry Palmer Alexander in 1866.

The daffodil grower Reverend George Engleheart and his wife, Mary Engelheart, bought the house in 1901 and restored it. While living there, George developed a new type of daffodil bulb and Mary converted the bakehouse into a Roman Catholic chapel.

=== Endowment ===
Little Clarendon and its contents, neighbouring Lawes Cottage (previously home to the composer William Lawes), three further cottages, 27 acres of land and an endowment fund were bequeathed to the National Trust by Mary Engleheart and her daughter in 1940. They remained as tenants afterwards. The chapel continued to be used, and a condition of the gift was that Little Clarendon would be let only to Roman Catholics.

The house was given a Grade II* listing in 1960. In the early 2000s, after research by the National Trust, George Engleheart's daffodil breeds were grown in the gardens again.
