= Stockbridge Common Marsh =

Wetland in Hampshire, England

Coordinates: 51.102°N 1.499°W

- Site of Special Scientific Interest
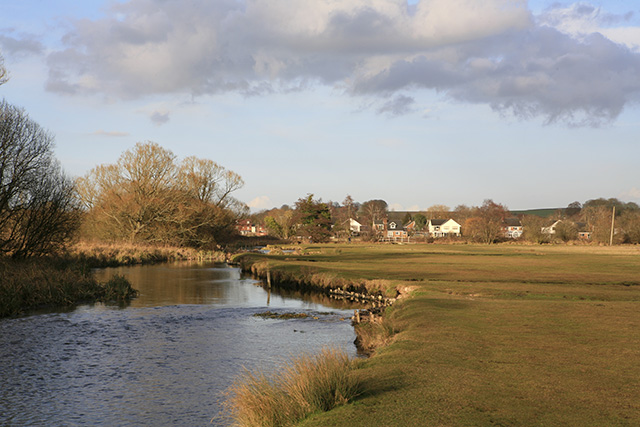
- Location of Stockbridge Common Marsh.
- Area of search: Hampshire
- Grid reference: SU 352 338
- Interest: Biological
- Area: 64.8 hectares (160 acres)
- Notification date: 1991
- Location map: Magic Map

Stockbridge Common Marsh is a 64.8-hectare (160-acre) biological Site of Special Scientific Interest south of Stockbridge in Hampshire. It is owned by the National Trust.

This site stretches for 2 kilometres (1.2 miles) along the flood plain of the River Test. It has wetland habitats including marsh, fen, carr, alluvial meadows and a large shallow lake. The marsh has a rich variety of flora, with 180 species of flowering plants, including bog pimpernel, adder’s-tongue fern, marsh valerian and bogbean.
