= Knowles Farm =

Coordinates: 50.5763°N 1.2996°W

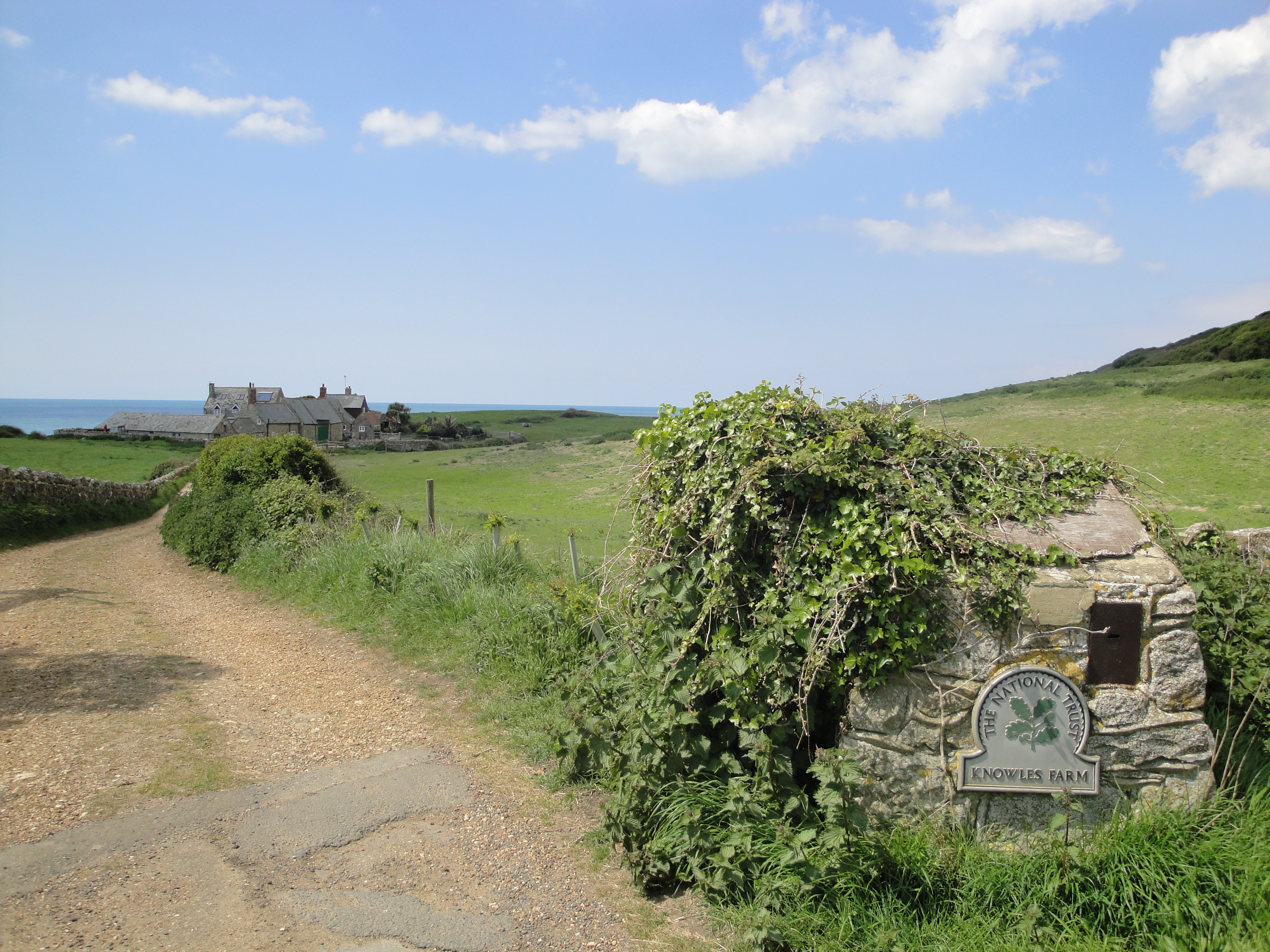
Knowles Farm entrance

Knowles Farm is the name of an area of National Trust land at the southern tip of the Isle of Wight located at St. Catherine's Point. It takes its name from a nearby farm which lies outside the NT area just along the southern edge of it.

The area is 170 acres (0.69 km^{2}) in total and was acquired by the NT in 1967 using its Neptune funds. The land is an area of undercliff and is a mixture of scrub, grass downland and woodland, spread over a rough folded and unstable landscape.

The area includes a carpark in the centre, a section of gravel beach to the west, a rocky bay called Watershoot Bay. St. Catherine's Point lighthouse lies just outside the area to the south east.
