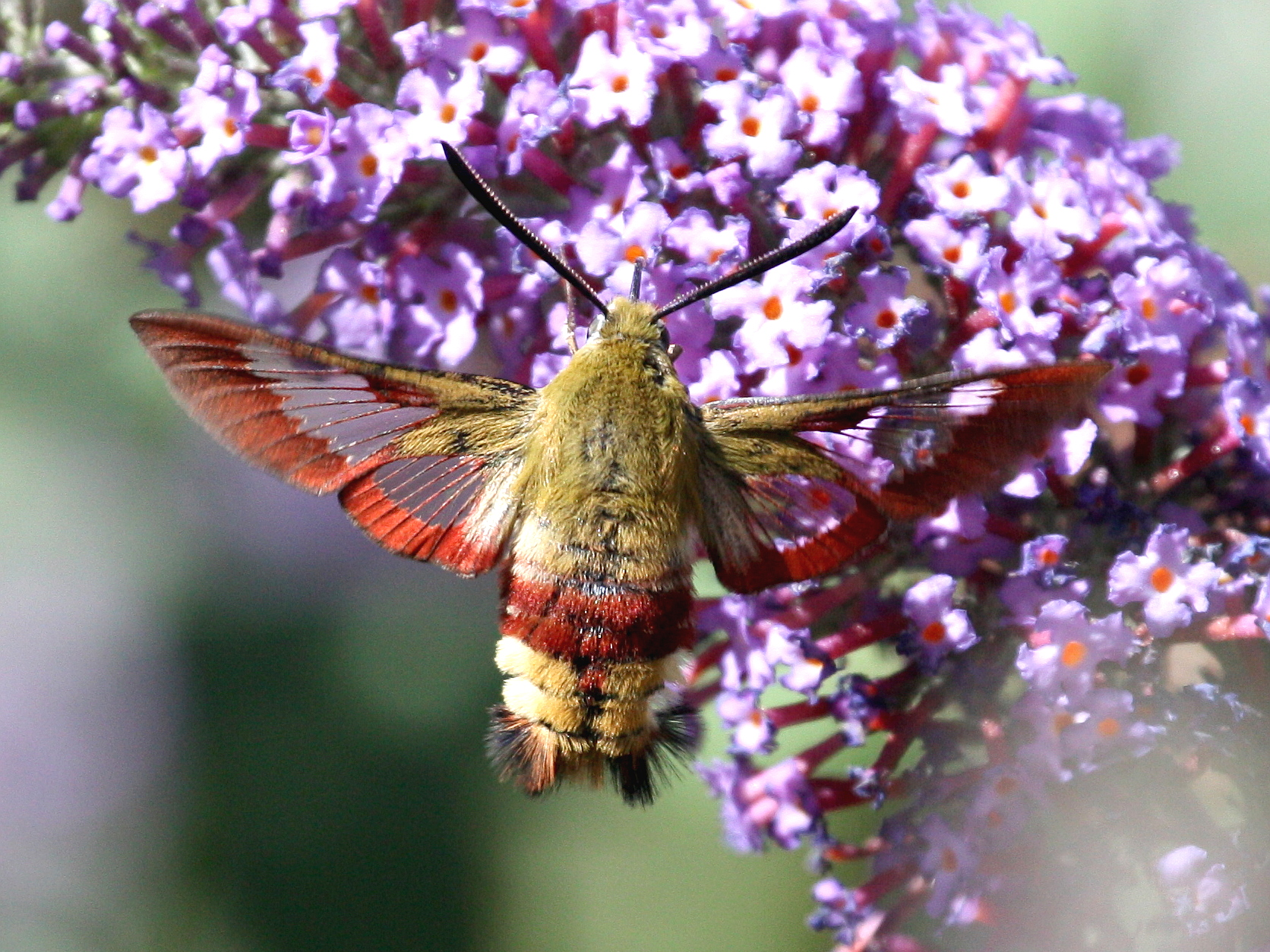

Scientific classification
- Kingdom: Animalia
- Phylum: Arthropoda
- Class: Insecta
- Order: Lepidoptera
- Family: Sphingidae
- Genus: Hemaris
- Species: H. fuciformis

Binomial name
- Hemaris fuciformis (Linnaeus, 1758)

Synonyms
- Sphinx fuciformis Linnaeus, 1758; Sphinx variegata Allioni, 1766; Macroglossa robusta Alphéraky, 1882; Macroglossa milesiformis Treitschke, 1834; Macroglossa lonicerae Zeller, 1869; Macroglossa caprifolii Zeller, 1869; Hemaris simillima Moore, 1888; Hemaris fuciformis rebeli Anger, 1919; Hemaris fuciformis obsoleta Lambillion, 1920; Hemaris fuciformis musculus Wagner, 1919; Hemaris fuciformis minor Lambillion, 1920; Hemaris fuciformis jakutana (Derzhavets, 1984); Haemorrhagia fuciformis jordani Clark, 1927; Haemorrhagia fuciformis circularis Stephan, 1924; Macroglossa bombyliformis heynei Bartel, 1898

= Hemaris fuciformis =

Species of moth

Hemaris fuciformis, known as the broad-bordered bee hawk-moth, is a moth of the family Sphingidae.

== Distribution ==
It is found in North Africa, Europe (except northern Scandinavia) and central and eastern Asia.

== Description ==
The wingspan is 38–48 millimetres (1.5–1.9 in). The moth flies from April to September depending on the location. Hemaris fuciformis larvae.jpg|Figs, 3, 3a larvae after last moult 3b larva just before pupation 3c pupa The larvae feed on honeysuckle and Galium species.

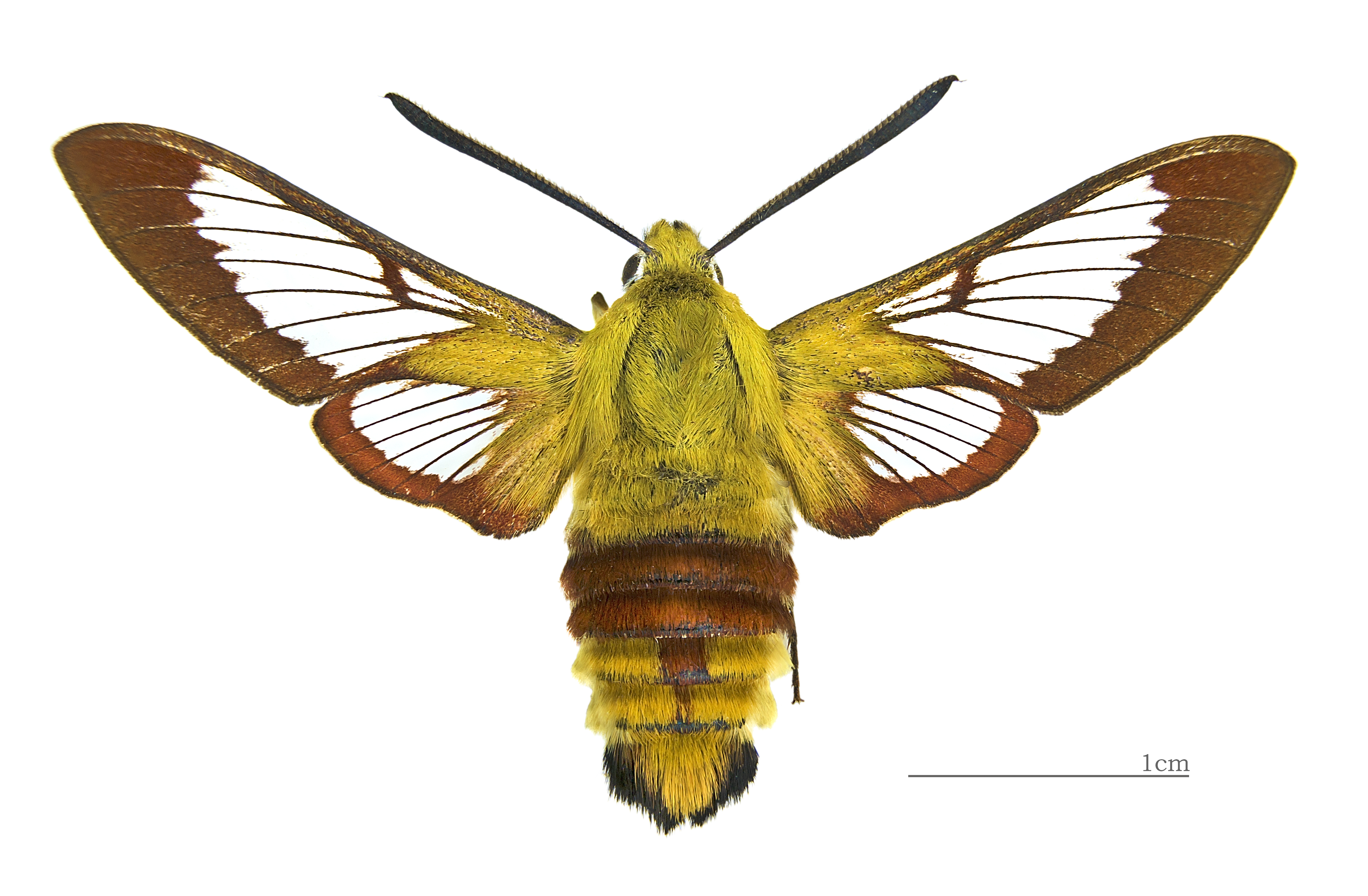
♂

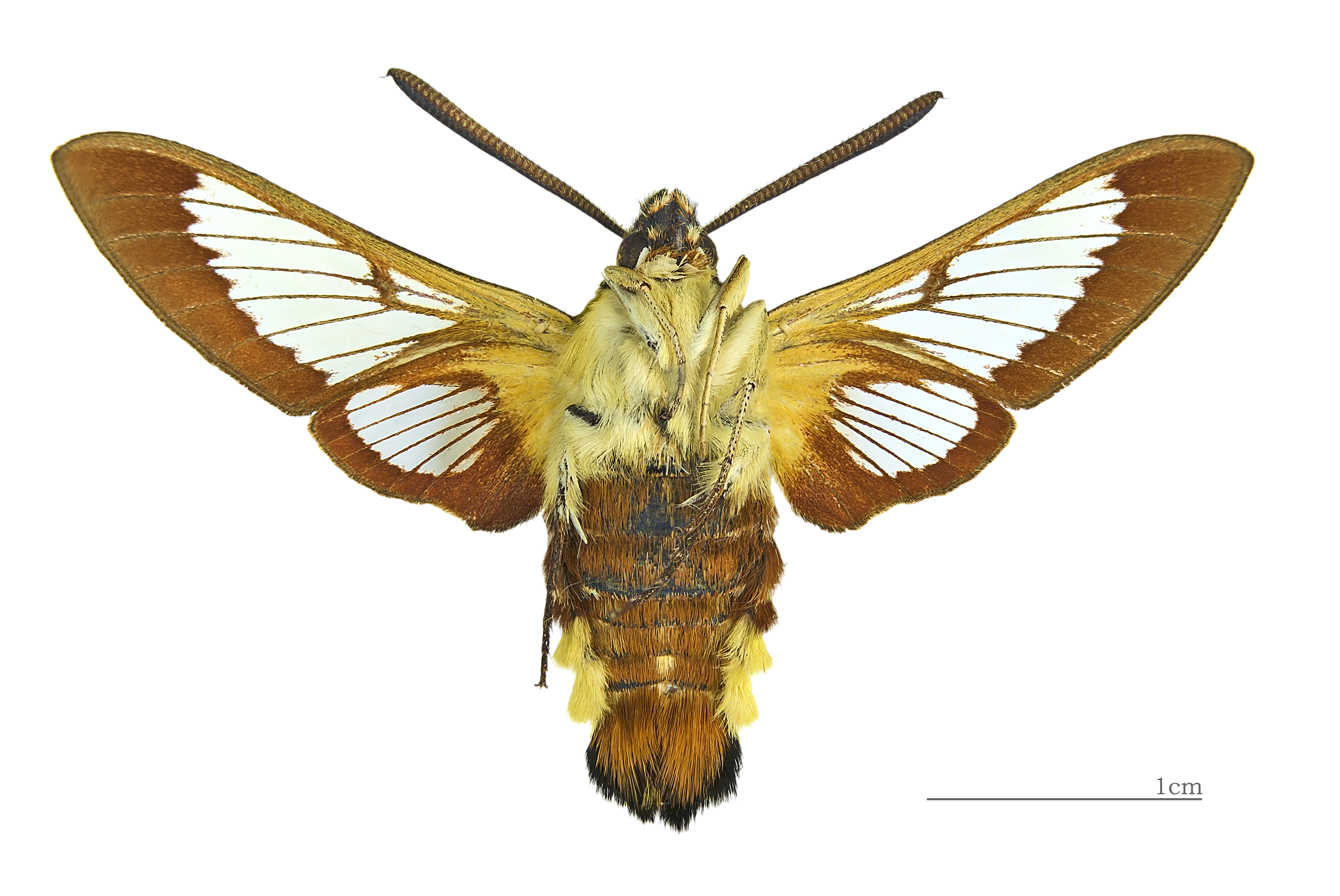
♂ △

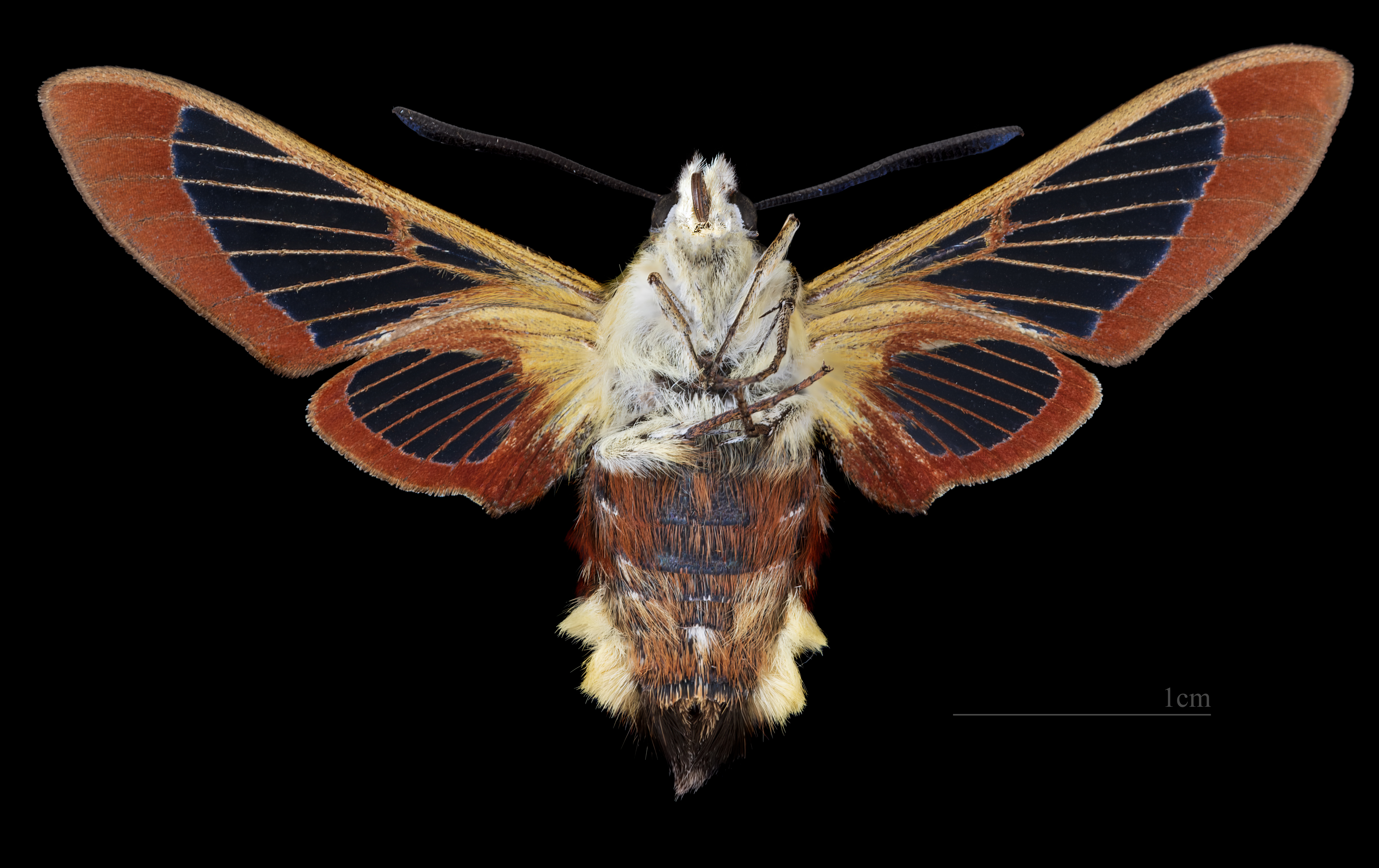
♀

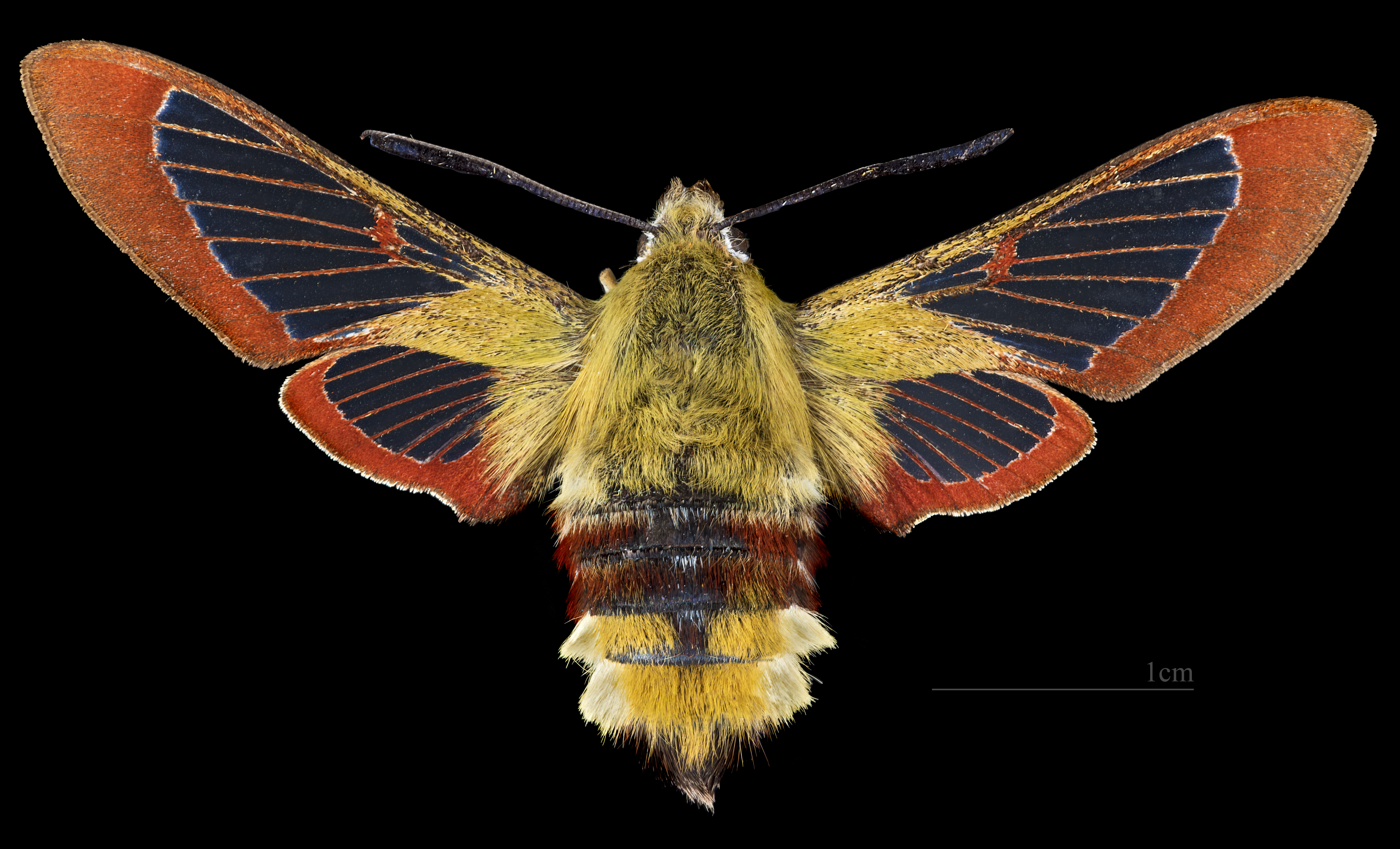
♀ △

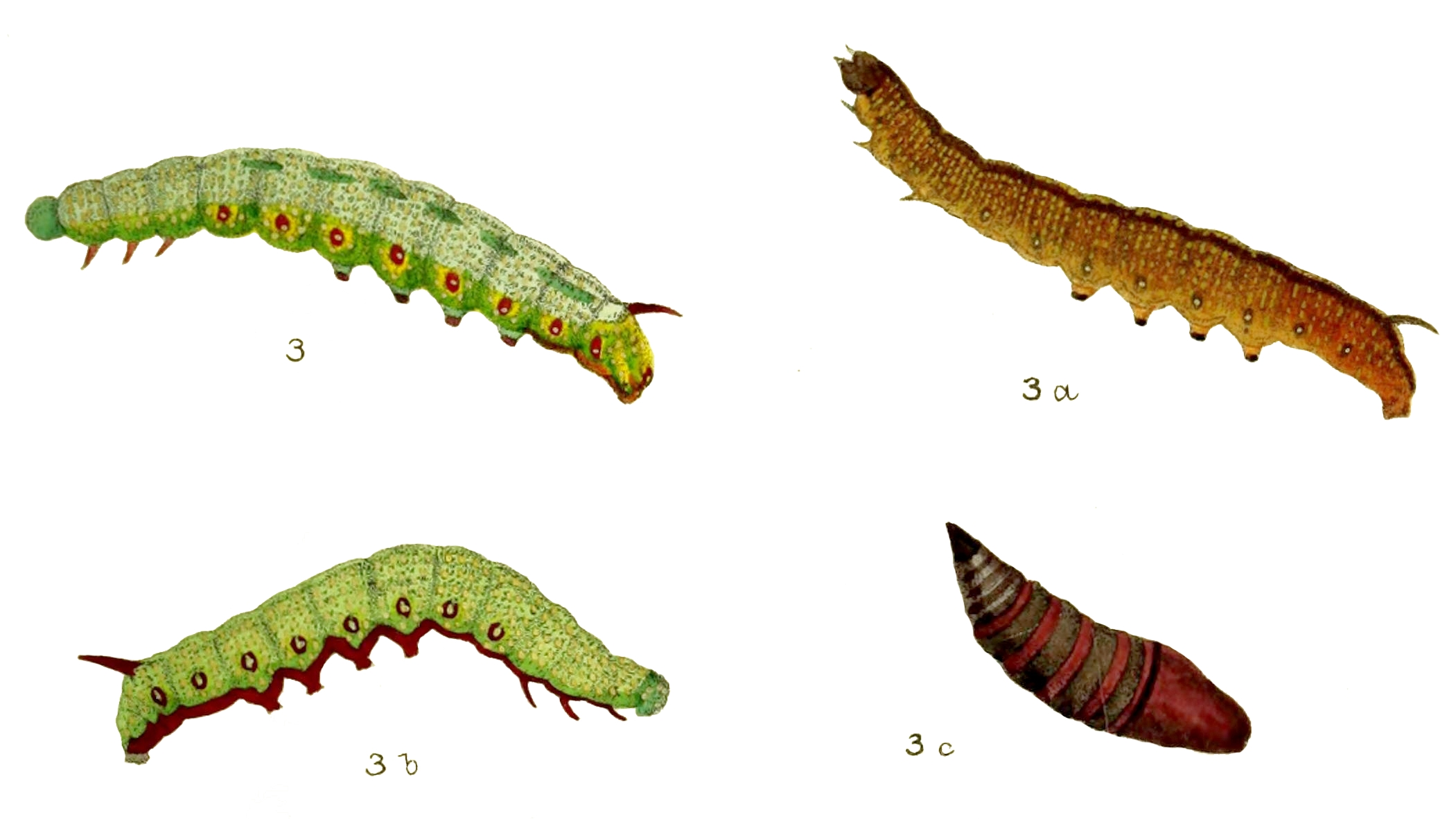
Figs, 3, 3a larvae after last moult 3b larva just before pupation 3c pupa

A bee hawk moth feeding on Aubrieta flowers (32x slow motion)

== Subspecies ==
- Hemaris fuciformis fuciformis
- Hemaris fuciformis pseudodentata Dubatolov, 2003 (Kopetdagh Mountains)
