= Piney Copse =

Woodland in Surrey, England

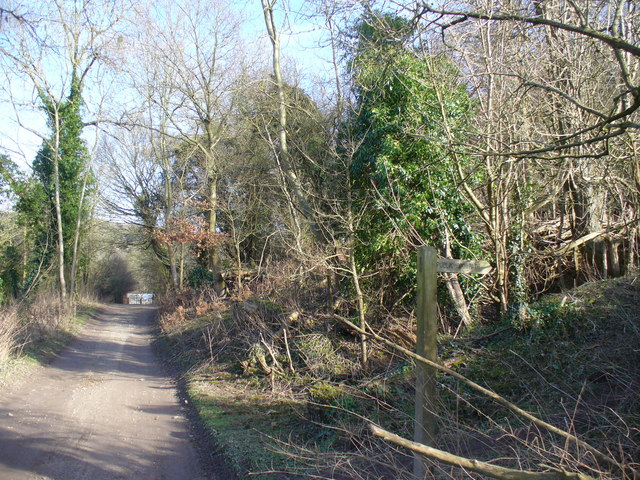
- Western edge of Piney Copse seen from Beggars Lane

- Location within Surrey
- Interactive map of Piney Copse

Geography
- Location: Surrey, England
- OS grid: TQ094478
- Coordinates: 51.2195°N 0.4346°W
- Area: 1.7 hectares (4.2 acres)

Piney Copse is 1.7 hectares (4.2 acres) of woodland located approximately 450 metres (1,480 ft) east of Gomshall railway station and north of the Surrey village of Abinger Hammer. The copse is bisected by a public footpath. It was once owned by E. M. Forster, who used to live nearby and purchased the wood using funds from book sales - principally from A Passage to India - in order to prevent it from being developed into housing. When Forster died in 1970, he transferred ownership of the land in his will to the National Trust. In 1926 Forster wrote a short essay about Piney Copse in "Abinger Harvest", entitled "My Wood".

The woodland is a secondary woodland comprising oaks, sweet chestnuts, and beech trees. The soil is freely draining, highly acidic, and loamy/sandy, sitting just south of a band of very chalky soils.

== Transport ==
=== Rail ===
The nearest railway station is Gomshall, which is served by Great Western Railway services on the North Downs Line.

=== Road ===
The nearest primary road is the A25, with access to the copse available from the single-track road Beggars Lane. The copse can also be accessed from National Cycle Network Route 22 at its intersection with Hackhurst Lane.

== See also ==
- E. M. Forster
- Abinger Hammer
- Gomshall
- Surrey Hills Area Of Outstanding Natural Beauty
