= Downs Banks =

National Trust-owned woodland and heath in Staffordshire, England

Coordinates: 52.930°N 2.148°W

Downs Bank, also known as Barlaston Downs, is an area of open countryside, located two miles (3 km) north of the town of Stone in Staffordshire, and four miles (6 km) south of the city of Stoke-on-Trent. It is owned and managed by the National Trust.

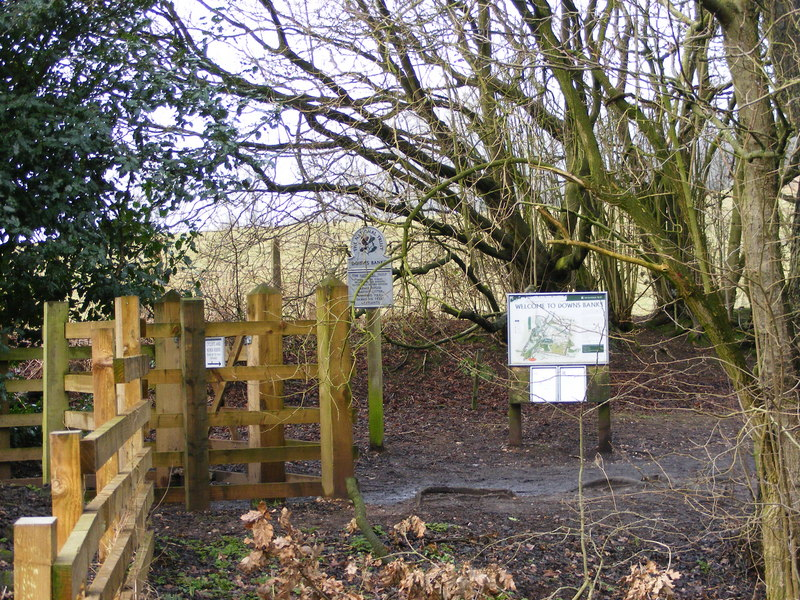
Downs Banks Entrance

== Area and habitats ==
The property covers about 166 acres (67 ha) and consists of a glaciated valley with a stream running the length of the property from North to South. Other habitats include woodland and heathland.

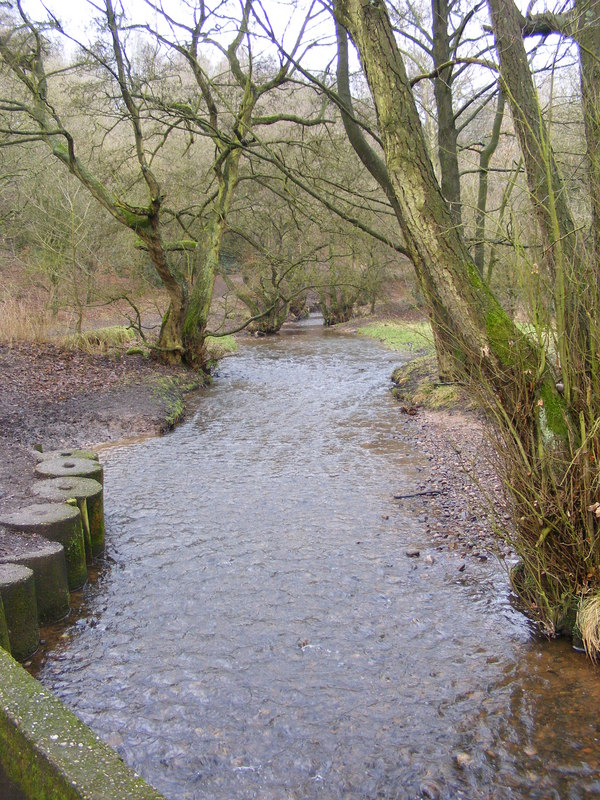
Downs Banks Brook

== Management ==
The heath has been subject to a restoration project by the National Trust, which resulted in the re-introduction of summer-grazing cattle on the hillsides of the property in 2005. The cattle help to keep bracken and scrub birch trees under control, and to allow a variety of old grasses, heather, plus bilberry, gorse and broom to regain habitat. It is hoped that this will encourage species such as viviparous lizards to increase in population.

The footpaths and bridleway suffer from erosion due to their heavy use. Local people help National Trust staff by becoming volunteers, carrying out tasks such as litter clearing, footpath work, fencing and habitat management.

The stream through the property was seriously polluted with diesel oil in April 2008, originating upstream from beyond the reserve. Since then it has recovered and has a healthy fish population, including European bullhead and brown trout. .

== Access and activities ==
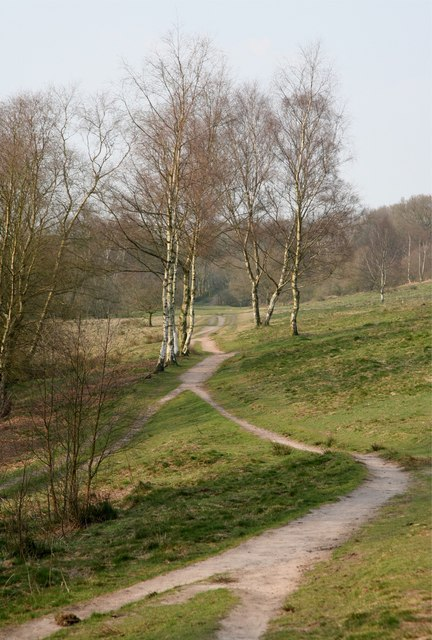
Downs Banks

As of 2020 there is no rail service to the nearby Barlaston railway station, the station having been closed to trains in 2003, although the line remains busy with passenger and goods traffic. A Crewe to London via Stoke on Trent passenger service now stops at Stone railway station – access to the Downs Banks is then by a two-mile walk along lanes and footpaths.

The site is 'open access' on foot to all. As well as footpaths there is also a waymarked bridleway which may be used with care by horse riders and cyclists. There is an unsurfaced car park.

The site is popular with dog walkers, both amateur and professional. In the summer of 2008 two bins were erected for dog waste: local National Trust members raised the funds for these bins.

The site is sometimes used by the Potteries Orienteering Club, and before them by the Walton Chasers since the 1950s. The club has made a large-scale map of the site, at 1:5000.

== Monuments, history and customs ==
In the 18th century a farm on Downs Bank grew hops for Joule's Brewery, who rented it from Viscount Sidmouth. The area was well known to the author Mary Renault, whose parents moved to live nearby in the early 1930s.

Hops growing on Downs Bank continued until the 1940s, and there was also cattle grazing until 1959. The area was subject to purchase with the help of a public subscription and it was given to the National Trust by John Joule in 1950 as "an offering for victory in the 1939-45 War, and as a memorial to those who died" – apparently on the grounds that it had originally been common land, and should thus be open again to local people. However, after 1950 the lack of grazing caused its characteristic heathland to decline, as bracken and birch were allowed to invade.

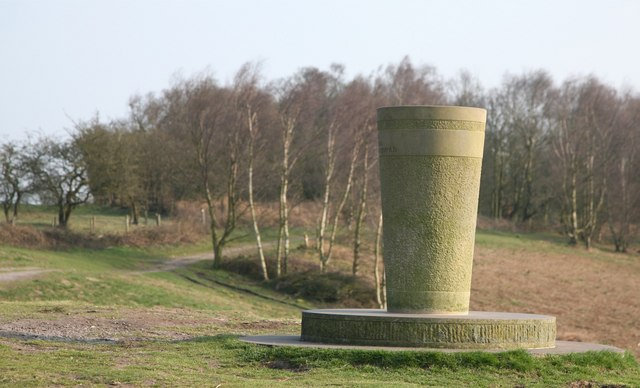
Downs Banks Toposcope

There is a Millennium Viewpoint stone at one of the highest points, with a toposcope (a disc of metal sight-lines/landmarks) embedded in the top of it. The toposcope went missing in November 2015. By March 2017 it has been replaced by a new toposcope.

The area was part of the route of the annual New Year's Eve Barlaston Wassail, in which a torchlit procession walked from the nearby village to Downs Banks and back again.
