= Stockbridge Down =

Protected area in Hampshire, England

Coordinates: 51.112°N 1.460°W

- Site of Special Scientific Interest
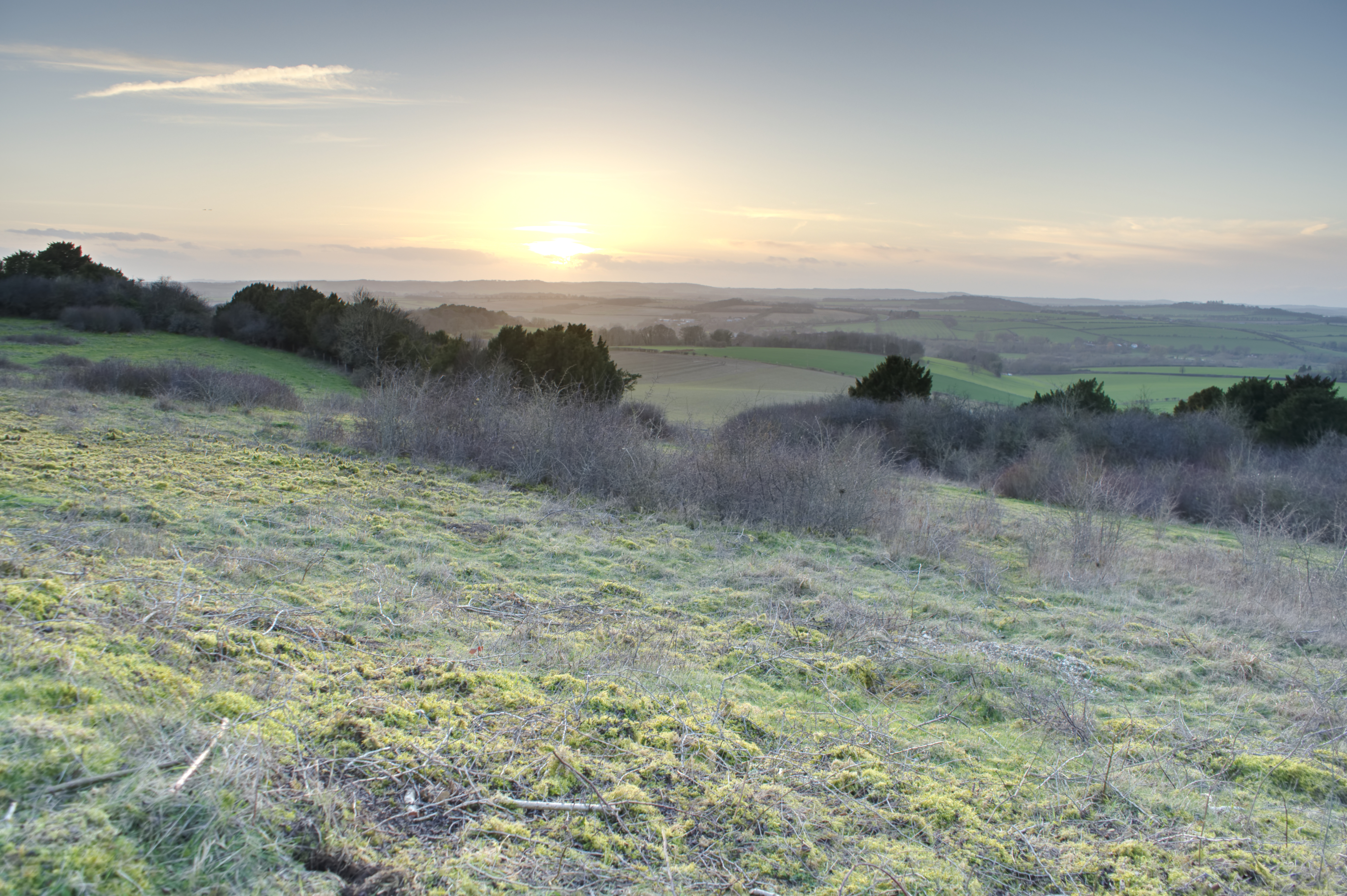
- Location of Stockbridge Down.
- Area of search: Hampshire
- Grid reference: SU 379 349
- Interest: Biological
- Area: 69.8 hectares (172 acres)
- Notification date: 1985
- Location map: Magic Map

Stockbridge Down is a 69.8-hectare (172-acre) biological Site of Special Scientific Interest east of Stockbridge in Hampshire. It is a Nature Conservation Review site, Grade 2. It is owned by the National Trust and parts of it are designated as scheduled monuments, including an Iron Age hillfort (Woolbury) and fourteen Bronze Age burial mounds.

This site has a variety of scrub and grassland habitats on a north-west facing slope of chalk and a clay-with-flints plateau. There is a diverse range of butterflies, such as chalk-hill blue, marbled white and dark green fritillary, while moths include the oblique striped.
