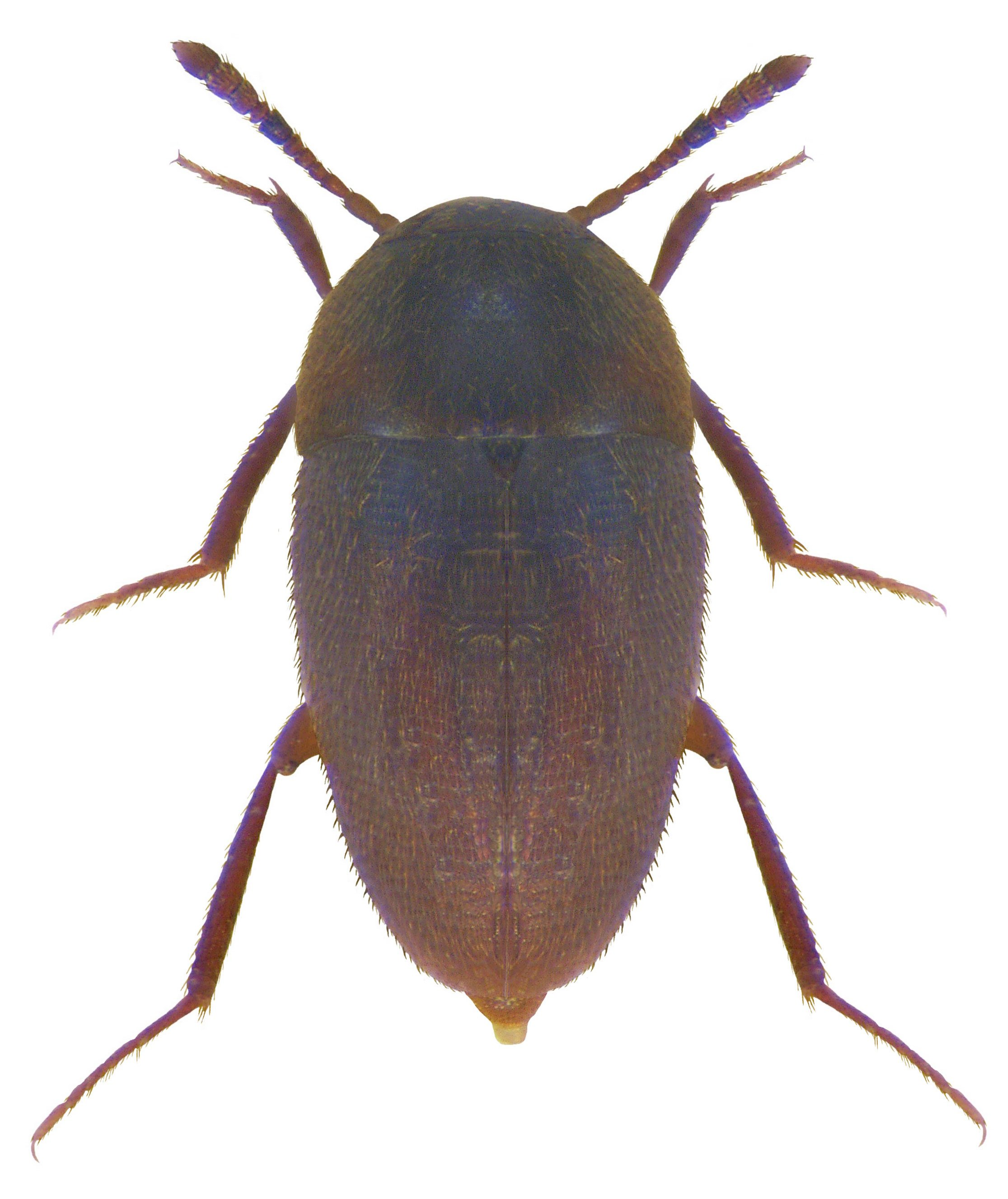

Scientific classification
- Kingdom: Animalia
- Phylum: Arthropoda
- Class: Insecta
- Order: Coleoptera
- Suborder: Polyphaga
- Infraorder: Staphyliniformia
- Family: Leiodidae
- Genus: Nemadus
- Species: N. colonoides

Binomial name
- Nemadus colonoides (Kraatz, 1851)

= Nemadus colonoides =

Species of beetle

Nemadus colonoides is a species of beetle in the Leiodidae family that can be found in such European countries as Belarus, Belgium, Bulgaria, Croatia, Czech Republic, France, Germany, Italy, Latvia, Poland, Romania, Slovakia, Slovenia, Scandinavia, and the Netherlands.
