= Witley Common =

Woodland and heath near Witley, Surrey, England

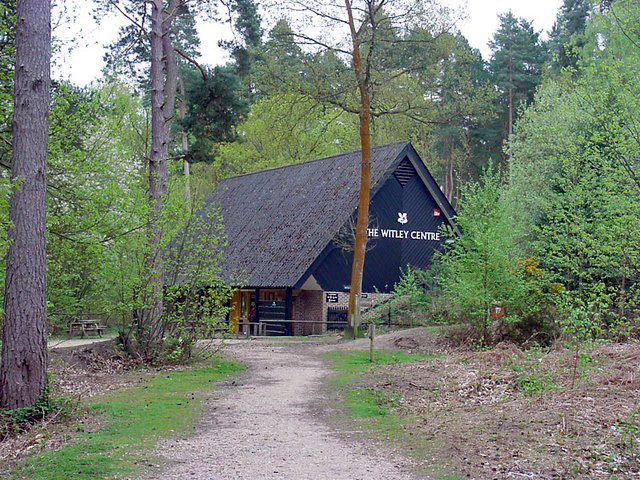
- Witley Common Visitors Centre
- Interactive map of Witley Common
- Type: Woodland and heath
- Nearest town: Witley
- Coordinates: 51°09′14″N 0°40′30″W
- Operator: National Trust
- Open: Yes

Witley Common is an area of woodland and heath, close to Witley, Surrey, England. It is part of a much larger Site of Special Scientific Interest, the Thursley, Hankley and Frensham Commons.

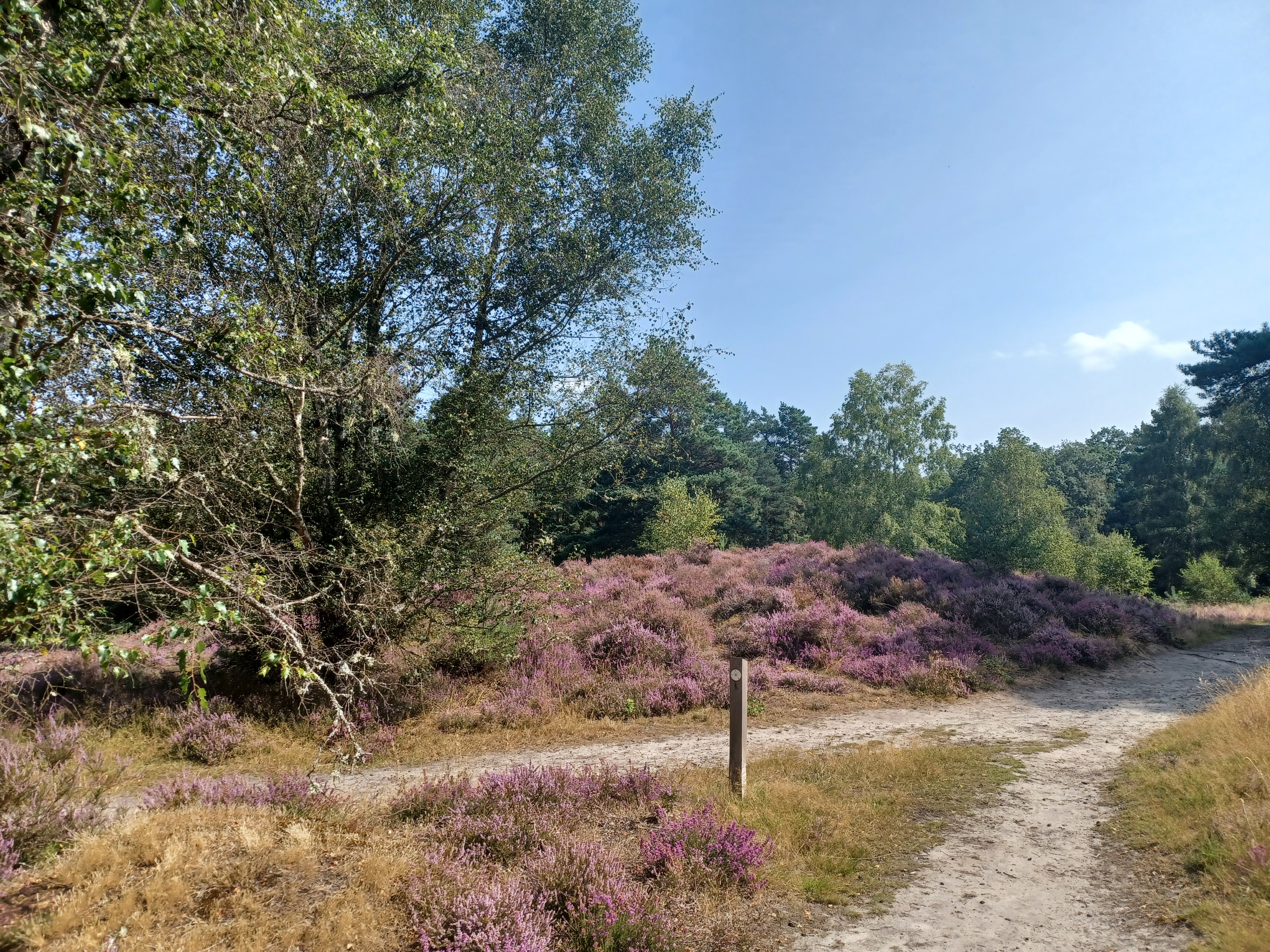
Bowl barrow on Witley Common

The land has been occupied since the Bronze Age — it features a group of four bowl barrows which have been dated to this period. It has been used as common land by many generations over the centuries — particularly for grazing, turf-cutting and, during the 16th and 17th centuries, for iron workings.

Witley Common again proved useful during the First and Second World Wars when the land was used by the army as a training camp (Witley Camp) with up to 20,000 soldiers based there at one point. The poet, Wilfred Owen, was posted there in June 1916, after completing his basic training, to be commissioned into the 2nd Battalion, Manchester Regiment.

In the late 1940s, the common was gradually restored to its pre-war condition.

Today it is managed by the National Trust, to provide a mixture of habitats for wildlife, with birch, oak and pine woodland, as well as open heathland. Birdlife includes willow warblers, tree pipits and woodlarks. The area is populated by many rare species. The area is a water catchment for the upper reaches of the River Wey.

== Witley Centre ==
Witley Common contains a nature information centre, known as The Witley Centre, built and managed by the National Trust. The centre features a countryside exhibition and often hosts school groups and children's holiday activities.
