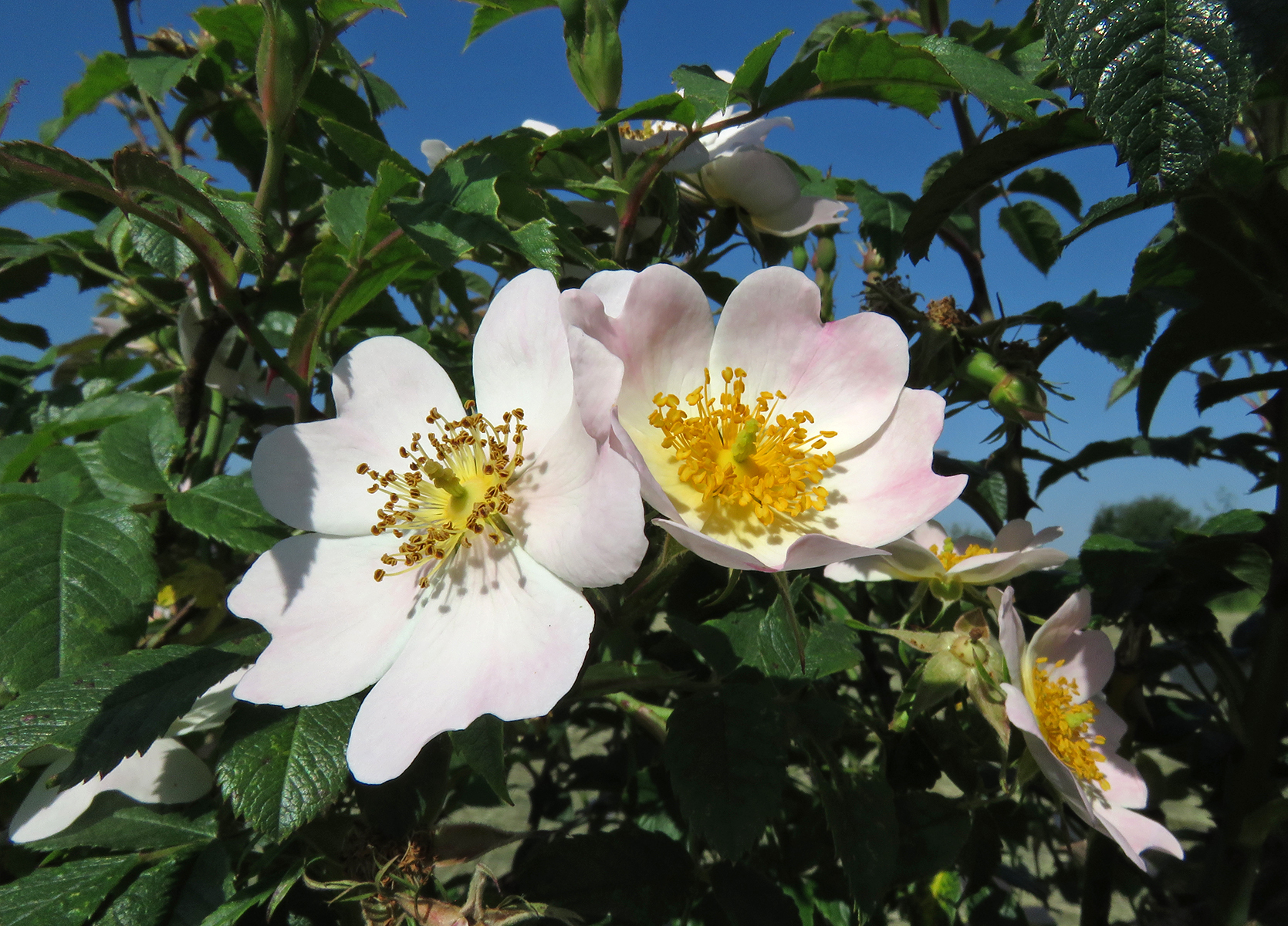
- Flowers
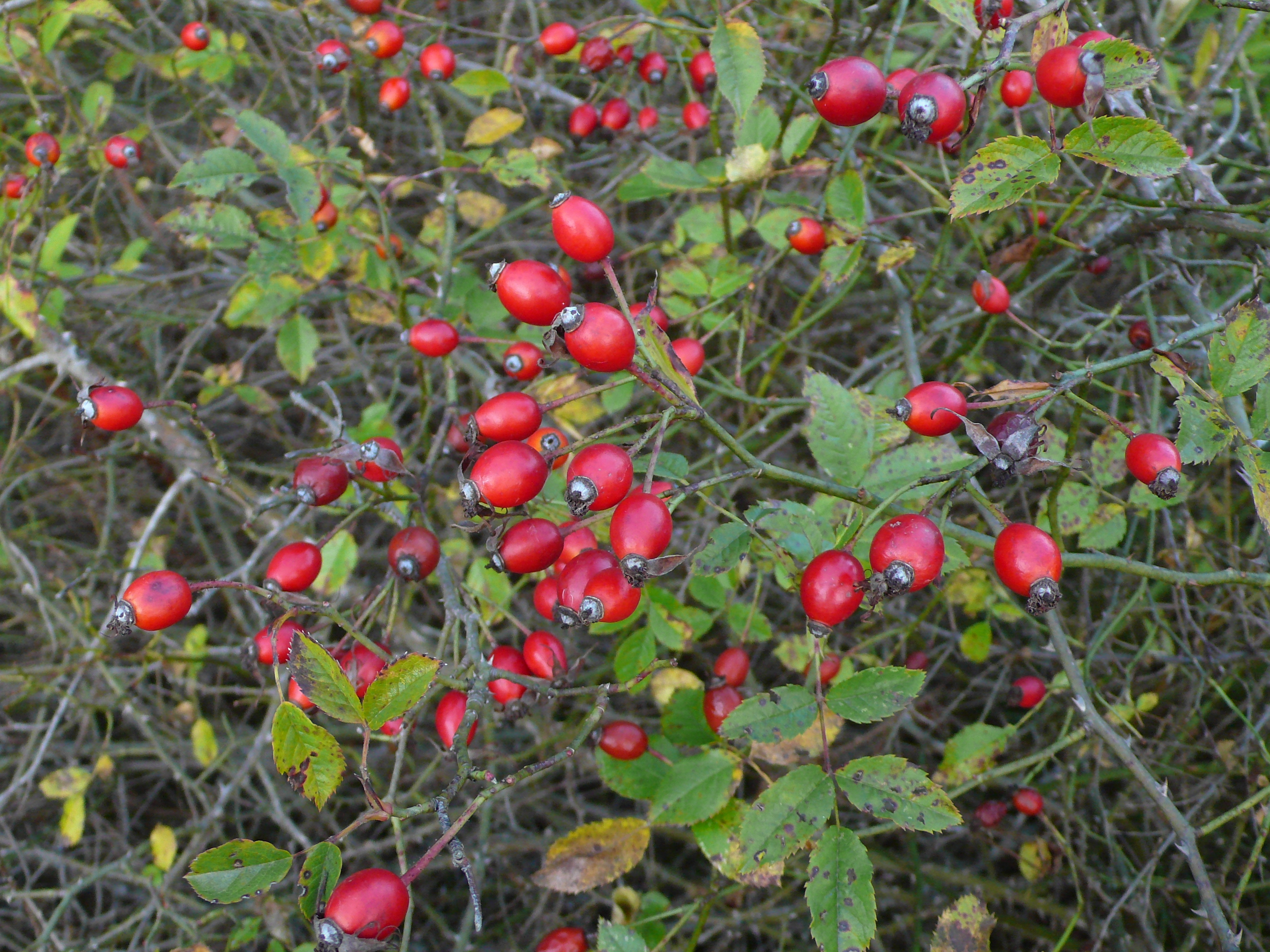
- Hips

Scientific classification
- Kingdom: Plantae
- Clade: Tracheophytes
- Clade: Angiosperms
- Clade: Eudicots
- Clade: Rosids
- Order: Rosales
- Family: Rosaceae
- Genus: Rosa
- Species: R. stylosa

Binomial name
- Rosa stylosa Desv.

Synonyms
- List: Ripartia stylosa (Desv.) Gand.; Rosa arvensis var. fastigiata (Bastard ex Desv.) Hook.f.; Rosa arvensis subsp. stylosa (Desv.) Baker; Rosa arvensis var. stylosa (Desv.) Lej.; Rosa arvensis var. systyla (Bastard) Hook.f.; Rosa australis Puget & Ripart; Rosa brevistyla DC.; Rosa brevistyla var. glandulosa Ser.; Rosa brevistyla var. lanceolata Tratt.; Rosa brevistyla var. leucochroa (Desv.) DC.; Rosa brevistyla var. systyla (Bastard) DC.; Rosa calostyla Gand.; Rosa canina var. cantabrica (Crép.) C.Vicioso ex O.Bolòs & Vigo; Rosa canina var. evanida (Christ) P.V.Heath; Rosa canina var. fastigiata (Bastard) Desv.; Rosa canina var. leucochroa (Desv.) Boulenger; Rosa canina var. monsignatica (C.Vicioso) C.Vicioso ex O.Bolòs & Vigo; Rosa canina var. pubescens (Crép.) R.Keller; Rosa canina subsp. stylosa (Desv.) Masclans; Rosa canina var. stylosa (Desv.) P.Fourn.; Rosa cantabrica (Crép.) Gand.; Rosa chlorantha Sauzé & Maillard; Rosa collina Sm.; Rosa × collina var. fastigiata (Bastard) Thory; Rosa communis var. cantabrica (Crép.) Rouy & E.G.Camus; Rosa communis var. chlorantha (Sauzé & Maillard) Rouy & E.G.Camus; Rosa communis var. garroutei (Puget & Ripart) Rouy & E.G.Camus; Rosa communis var. immitis (Déségl.) Rouy & E.G.Camus; Rosa communis var. lanceolata (Lindl.) Rouy & E.G.Camus; Rosa communis var. leucochroa (Desv.) Rouy & E.G.Camus; Rosa communis var. microphylla Rouy & E.G.Camus; Rosa communis var. parvula Rouy & E.G.Camus; Rosa communis var. pubescens (Crép.) Rouy & E.G.Camus; Rosa communis subsp. stylosa (Desv.) Rouy & E.G.Camus; Rosa communis var. systyla (Bastard) Rouy & E.G.Camus; Rosa × dumetorum var. fastigiata (Bastard) Chevall.; Rosa × dumetorum var. stylosa (Desv.) L.A.W.Hasse; Rosa erratica Ripart; Rosa evanida (Christ) Almq.; Rosa garroutei Puget & Ripart; Rosa haynaldiana Borbás; Rosa immitis Déségl.; Rosa kuncii Borbás; Rosa leucochroa Desv.; Rosa leucochroa var. angusta Desv.; Rosa leucochroa var. rosea Desv.; Rosa lucronensis Sennen & T.S.Elias; Rosa maluqueri Sennen; Rosa modesta Ripart ex Crép.; Rosa nevadensis Crép.; Rosa parvula Sauzé & Maillard; Rosa pouzinii var. pubescens Crép.; Rosa pouzinii subsp. pubescens (Crép.) Arcang.; Rosa puberula (Ripart ex R.Keller) Crép.; Rosa pygmaeopsis J.B.Keller & Hanausek; Rosa repens var. systyla (Bastard) Regel; Rosa rustica Léman; Rosa scandens var. leucochroa (Desv.) Wallr.; Rosa stylaris Gentil; Rosa stylosa albiflora Gren.; Rosa stylosa var. anceps (Bouteiller) R.Keller; Rosa stylosa f. anceps (Bouteiller) Malinv.; Rosa stylosa var. archetypa Dumort.; Rosa stylosa var. australis (Puget & Ripart) R.Keller; Rosa stylosa var. beucensis Borza & Nyár.; Rosa stylosa f. brachystyla R.Keller; Rosa stylosa var. briquetiana R.Keller; Rosa stylosa subvar. bunophila Ripart ex R.Keller; Rosa stylosa subsp. cantabrica (Crép.) Malag.; Rosa stylosa var. cantabrica Crép.; Rosa stylosa subsp. chlorantha (Sauzé & Maillard) Sennen; Rosa stylosa subvar. chlorantha (Sauzé & Maillard) R.Keller; Rosa stylosa var. chlorantha (Sauzé & Maillard) Corb.; Rosa stylosa var. congesta Ripart ex R.Keller; Rosa stylosa conica Charb.; Rosa stylosa var. corymbosa Desv.; Rosa stylosa var. cristata Wolley-Dod; Rosa stylosa var. desvauxiana Ser.; Rosa stylosa subsp. desvauxiana Tourlet; Rosa stylosa var. desvauxii Baker; Rosa stylosa subvar. dubia Ripart ex R.Keller; Rosa stylosa var. duffouriana H.J.Coste; Rosa stylosa eglandulosa Charb.; Rosa stylosa subvar. erratica Ripart ex R.Keller; Rosa stylosa var. evanida Christ; Rosa stylosa var. fastigiata (Bastard) Corb.; Rosa stylosa subvar. fastigiata (Bastard) R.Keller; Rosa stylosa f. fastigiata (Bastard ex Desv.) R.Keller & Gams; Rosa stylosa fouilladei Charb.; Rosa stylosa var. glandulosa Ser.; Rosa stylosa var. glaucescens Buser ex Gremli; Rosa stylosa var. haynaldiana (Borbás) Ker.-Nagy; Rosa stylosa var. immitis (Déségl.) R.Keller; Rosa stylosa f. infida Chast.; Rosa stylosa var. kuncii (Borbás) Ker.-Nagy; Rosa stylosa var. lanceolata (Lindl.) Ser.; Rosa stylosa subvar. latistipulata (Boreau) R.Keller; Rosa stylosa subvar. leucochroa (Desv.) R.Keller; Rosa stylosa var. leucochroa (Desv.) Ser.; Rosa stylosa subvar. levistyla Ripart ex R.Keller; Rosa stylosa subvar. massilvanensis (Ozanon & Duffort) R.Keller; Rosa stylosa mentita Charb.; Rosa stylosa f. microphylla H.J.Coste ex R.Keller; Rosa stylosa f. microphylloides R.Keller; Rosa stylosa subsp. monsignatica (C.Vicioso) Malag.; Rosa stylosa var. monsignatica C.Vicioso; Rosa stylosa var. monsoniana Ser.; Rosa stylosa var. mutabilis Franch. ex R.Keller; Rosa stylosa var. naias (Gand.) R.Keller; Rosa stylosa subsp. nevadensis (Crép.) Malag.; Rosa stylosa var. nevadensis Crép.; Rosa stylosa var. nuda R.Keller; Rosa stylosa nuda Gren.; Rosa stylosa var. obscura (Christ) R.Keller; Rosa stylosa f. obscura Christ; Rosa stylosa var. opaca Baker; Rosa stylosa var. palatina R.Keller; Rosa stylosa subvar. parvula (Rouy & E.G.Camus) R.Keller; Rosa stylosa propinqua Charb.; Rosa stylosa subvar. pseudocorymbifera (Rouy) R.Keller; Rosa stylosa var. ptychophylla (Boulenger) Wolley-Dod; Rosa stylosa var. puberula Ripart ex R.Keller; Rosa stylosa rosella Charb.; Rosa stylosa rubella Charb.; Rosa stylosa subsp. rusticana (Déségl.) Tourlet; Rosa stylosa var. rusticana (Déségl.) R.Keller; Rosa stylosa subsp. sadovensis Degen & Urum.; Rosa stylosa submissa Charb.; Rosa stylosa f. systyla (Bastard) Malinv.; Rosa stylosa subsp. systyla (Bastard) Nyman; Rosa stylosa subsp. systyla (Bastard) Crép.; Rosa stylosa var. systyla (Bastard) Baker; Rosa stylosa subvar. systyla (Bastard) R.Keller; Rosa stylosa subvar. touronicensis Chast. ex R.Keller; Rosa stylosa transiens Charb.; Rosa stylosa trivialis Gren.; Rosa stylosa f. turonicensis Chast.; Rosa stylosa var. typica R.Keller; Rosa stylosa vestita Gren.; Rosa stylosa f. virginea (Ripart ex Déségl.) Malinv.; Rosa stylosa var. virginea (Ripart ex Déségl.) R.Keller; Rosa systyla Bastard; Rosa systyla f. anomala Chast.; Rosa systyla var. desvauxiana Ser. ex W.D.J.Koch; Rosa systyla var. desvauxiana W.D.J.Koch; Rosa systyla erubescens Préaub. & Bouvet; Rosa systyla var. lanceolata Lindl.; Rosa systyla var. latistipulata Boreau; Rosa systyla var. leucochroa (Desv.) W.D.J.Koch; Rosa systyla var. monsoniae Lindl.; Rosa systyla var. oblonga Fouilloy; Rosa systyla var. ovata Lindl.; Rosa systyla f. perplexa Chast.; Rosa systyla f. praetermissa Chast.; Rosa systyla var. pygmaeopsis (J.B.Keller & Hanausek) Heinr.Braun; Rosa systyla f. rusticella Chast.; Rosa systyla f. rusticula Chast.; Rosa systyla f. surda Chast.; Rosa systyla var. typica Heinr.Braun

= Rosa stylosa =

Species of plant

Rosa stylosa, the short-styled field rose, is a species of flowering plant in the family Rosaceae, native to western and southern Europe, and northwestern Africa. It has gone extinct in Hungary. It is not readily available from commercial suppliers.
