= Pinney =

Pinney is a surname. Notable people with the name include:

- Charles Pinney (1793-1867), Bristol merchant and politician
- Clay Pinney, American special effects artist
- James A. Pinney (1835–1914), American mayor
- John Frederick Pinney (1719–1762), English MP and Nevis plantation owner
- John Pinney (1740–1818), Nevis plantation owner and Bristol sugar merchant
- Nathaniel Pinney (born 1990), English soccer player
- Norman Pinney (1804–1862), American teacher, minister and author
- Patrick Pinney (born 1962), American voice actor
- Rachel Pinney (1909–95), British doctor
- Ray Pinney (born 1954), American Football player
- Sir Reginald Pinney (1863–1943), British Army officer
- Roy Pinney (1911–2010), American herpetologist, photographer, journalist and war correspondent
- Ryan Pinney (born 1980), American paracyclist
- Russell Jan Pinney (born 1946), American insurance salesman
- Sean P. Pinney, American cardiologist
- Silas U. Pinney (1833–99), American jurist and politician

== See also ==
- Gavin Pretor-Pinney, British designer and author
- Pinney's Beach, Nevis
- 14678 Pinney, Comet
- Pinny Cooke (1923–2004), New York politician
