= Margaret Steuart Pollard =

- Born: March 1, 1904
- Died: November 13, 1996 (aged 92); Truro, Cornwall, England
- Education: Newnham College, Cambridge
- Occupations: Poet; translator
- Spouse: Frank Pollard
- Relatives: William Ewart Gladstone (great great-uncle)
- Writing career
- Language: Cornish, English
- Notable works: Bewnans Alysaryn, Cornwall
- Notable awards: Benemerenti Medal

Margaret Steuart Pollard (née Gladstone; 1 March 1904 – 13 November 1996) was a poet and bard of the Cornish language. She was the founding member of Ferguson's Gang, a secret society of supporters of the National Trust, who had their headquarters at Shalford Mill.

From 1920, she attended Newnham College, Cambridge, where she was the first woman to gain first-class honours in Oriental Languages. She married Captain Frank Pollard, an expert on Cornish history, and they lived in Truro, Cornwall. By 1938, she had become a bard, and a member of the Cornish Gorsedd. She published Bewnans Alysaryn, a Cornish-language miracle play, in 1941. She was an enthusiastic supporter of campaigns to defend the landscape, language and traditions of Cornwall and rural England. On one occasion she donated £100 to the National Trust as part of Ferguson's Gang, wearing a full mask to preserve her anonymity.

In 1947, a book about her home county, entitled Cornwall, that she had written was published by Paul Elek. She has been described as "humorous, perceptive, and intelligent". In 1951 she converted to Roman Catholicism, and in 1973 built a Roman Catholic church dedicated to Our Lady of the Portal and St Piran on the site of a medieval chapel in Truro. For this she received the Benemerenti Medal from the Pope.

She remained an active poet and translator throughout her long life. She had given away much of her inherited wealth after her husband's death in 1968 and lived in a one-up-one-down, which was an old tin miner's cottage on Richmond Hill, Truro. She remained a romantic figure, dressed as she was in a long skirt and a scarf wrapped around her head. She died at the age of 93 on 13 November 1996 at Truro.

She was the great great-niece of former prime minister William Ewart Gladstone.
