= Diana White =

Diana White may refer to:

- Diana White (dancer), New York City Ballet dancer
- Diana White (artist) (1868–1950), British artist and translator
