= Reginald Pinney =

British Army general

Major-General Sir Reginald Pinney KCB DL
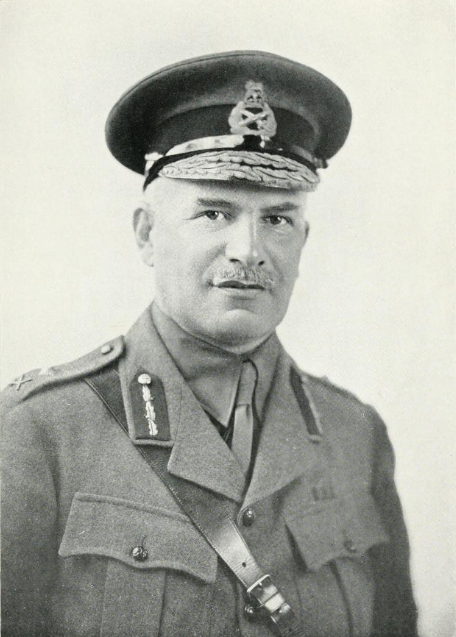
- Pinney, photographed here between 1915 and 1919
- Born: 2 August 1863; Clifton, Bristol, England
- Died: 18 February 1943 (aged 79)
- Military career
- Allegiance: United Kingdom
- Branch: British Army
- Service years: 1884−1919
- Rank: Major-General
- Unit: Royal Fusiliers
- Commands: 4th Battalion, Royal Fusiliers; Devon and Cornwall Brigade; 23rd Infantry Brigade; 33rd Division; 35th Division
- Conflicts: Second Boer War First World War: Battle of Neuve Chapelle; Battle of the Somme; Battle of Arras; Battle of Hazebrouck; Hundred Days Offensive
- Awards: Knight Commander of the Order of the Bath

Major-General Sir Reginald John Pinney KCB DL (2 August 1863 − 18 February 1943) was a British Army officer who served as a brigade and divisional commander on the Western Front during the First World War. While commanding a division at the Battle of Arras in 1917, he was immortalised as the "cheery old card" of Siegfried Sassoon's poem "The General".

Pinney served in South Africa during the Second Boer War with the Royal Fusiliers, into which he had been commissioned in 1884, and at the outbreak of the First World War was given command of an infantry brigade sent to reinforce the Western Front in November 1914. He led it in the early part of 1915, taking heavy losses at the Battle of Neuve Chapelle. That September he was given command of the 35th Division, a New Army division of "bantam" soldiers, which first saw action the following year at the Battle of the Somme; after three months in action, he was exchanged with the commander of the 33rd Division. He commanded the 33rd at Arras in 1917, with mixed results, and through the German spring offensive in 1918, where the division helped stabilise the defensive line after the Portuguese Expeditionary Corps (CEP) was routed.

After the war, he retired to rural Dorset, where he served as a local justice of the peace, as High Sheriff for the county, and as a deputy lieutenant, before his death in 1943.

== Early life and military career ==
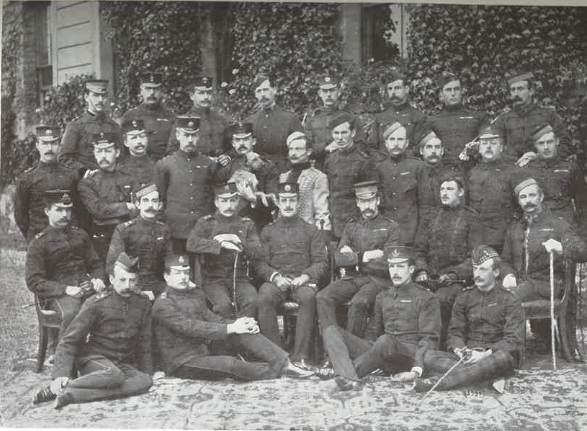
The Staff College, Camberley, class in 1890. Stood in the back row, third from the left, is Lieutenant R. J. Pinney.

Reginald John Pinney was born on 2 August 1863 in Clifton, Bristol, the eldest son of the Reverend John Pinney, vicar of Coleshill, Warwickshire, and his wife, Harriet. His paternal grandfather was Charles Pinney, a prominent merchant and former mayor of Bristol, whilst his maternal grandfather, John Wingfield-Digby, was a previous vicar of Coleshill; an uncle, John Wingfield-Digby, would later be the Conservative MP for North Dorset. John and Harriet Pinney had five more children, four sons and a daughter, before Harriet's death in 1877. At least one of Reginald's brothers, John, also passed into the armed forces, joining the Central India Horse of the British Indian Army.

After four years at Winchester College, Pinney entered the Royal Military College at Sandhurst in 1882. He passed out of the college and was appointed to the Royal Fusiliers (formerly titled as the 7th Regiment of Foot), one of the oldest regiments in the British Army, as a lieutenant on 6 February 1884. He spent five years with his regiment before attending the Staff College, Camberley, from 1889 to 1890; after leaving Camberley, he was promoted to captain in December 1891. From 1896 to 1901 he served on the staff as the deputy assistant adjutant-general (DAAG) at Quetta, in India, with a promotion to major in December 1898. He married Hester Head in 1900; the couple had three sons and three daughters.

Pinney saw active service in the Second Boer War, which began in October 1899, arriving in South Africa in November 1901 to become second-in-command of the 2nd Battalion, Royal Fusiliers (which had been there since the outbreak of the war in late 1899). He served with the battalion until the end of the war, which ended with the Peace of Vereeniging in June 1902.

Four months later he left Cape Town on the SS Salamis with other officers and men of the battalion, arriving at Southampton in late October, when the battalion was posted to Aldershot.

After his return he was promoted to lieutenant colonel and became commanding officer (CO) of the 4th Battalion of his regiment, with a brevet promotion to colonel in May 1906. He relinquished command of the battalion in May 1907 and then went on half-pay, receiving a promotion to full colonel that November. He later took up the position of assistant adjutant general (AAG) in Egypt in September 1909, taking over from Gerald Cuthbert.

He held this posting until July 1913 when he was transferred back to England to command a reserve unit, the Devon and Cornwall Brigade of the Wessex Division, a formation of the part time Territorial Force (TF).

== First World War ==
=== Brigade commander ===
Following the outbreak of the First World War in August 1914, the British Expeditionary Force (BEF) of seven Regular Army divisions (six infantry and one cavalry) was mobilised for service in France. At the same time, the TF was activated to replace them for home defence duties. The BEF represented almost all the Regular units stationed in the United Kingdom, but only about half the total strength of the Regular Army; the remainder was scattered in various stations around the British Empire, mainly in India and the Mediterranean. These units were withdrawn as quickly as they could be replaced by Indian or Territorial units, and formed into new divisions to reinforce the BEF.

The Wessex Division—now numbered as the 43rd—had been assigned for duty in India to free up Regular units there, with its staff and support units held back to form the framework of the new 8th Division, which was formed from returning Regular battalions. As a result, Pinney, promoted in August to the temporary rank of brigadier general, was relieved from command of his Territorial brigade in October and assigned as the first general officer commanding (GOC) of the newly formed 23rd Infantry Brigade, made up from three battalions that had been on garrison duty in Malta and one from Egypt. The four battalions of Pinney's 23rd Brigade were the 2nd Cameronians, 2nd Devonshires, 2nd Middlesex and 2nd West Yorkshires; all from Malta bar the Devonshires in Egypt. All were Regular units, with very few reservists, but, having spent a long period in colonial stations, they were considered as only partially trained compared to the units serving with the BEF.

The 8th Division, under the command of Major General Francis "Joey" Davies (who Pinney had been at the Staff College with over twenty years earlier), was sent to France in November; immediately after arrival, two battalions were deployed to hold a section of the front line for a week during the closing stages of the First Battle of Ypres. However, the brigade did not see its first major action under Pinney's command until 10 March 1915, when it was committed to action as part of the Battle of Neuve Chapelle. Pinney's 23rd Brigade met heavy resistance when it began its attack, due to a failure by the divisional artillery to bombard a large section of the defenders' trenches; the 2nd Middlesex, making a frontal assault, were wiped out almost completely. The other lead battalion of the brigade, the 2nd Cameronians, was enfiladed from the undamaged sector and took heavy losses, losing almost all its officers and retreating in confusion. Pinney quickly learned of this—he was only two hundred yards from the front line—and decided to continue the attack. As he was not able to call for artillery support, the only possible approach was to send in the two reserve battalions. The second assault suffered heavy casualties at the outset, and quickly had to be called off when it was discovered that the corps artillery was about to fire on the positions being attacked; the Devonshires and West Yorkshires were withdrawn, having taken high casualties and achieved little. After this, the attack continued to bog down, and whilst there was some success elsewhere in the divisional sector, nothing more was achieved by the 23rd Brigade. Following Neuve Chapelle, the brigade was reinforced with two battalions of the TF, the 1st/6th Cameronians and the 1st/7th Middlesex. At the Battle of Aubers on 9 May, 23rd Brigade was held in reserve by 8th Division and so escaped the heavy casualties of the two attacking brigades. Around noon a scratch force of all available infantry was pushed forward by the divisional commander to support these two brigades, including some units of Pinney's brigade.

=== Divisional command ===
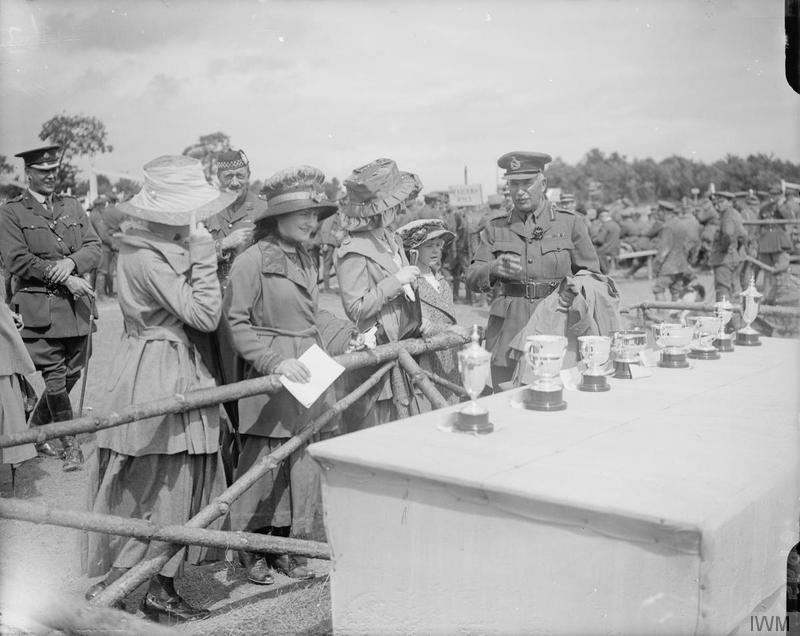
Major General Sir Reginald Pinney, GOC 33rd Division, and the Comtesse Marie-Thérèse de Hauteclocque looking at the prizes offered at the 33rd Division Horse Show, which were given away by her eldest daughter. July 1917.

Pinney relinquished command of the brigade to Travers Clarke in late June, when he was promoted to major general "for distinguished service in the Field" and returned to England to become GOC of the newly formed 35th Division, a New Army volunteer division. The division was mainly drawn from industrial areas of Northern England, with a high proportion of "bantams", men who were under the normal regulation height of 5 ft 3 in (160 cm) for army service. Among the officers Pinney first encountered in the 35th was Captain Bernard Montgomery, recently posted as brigade major of the 104th Infantry Brigade, who would later serve under him as the general staff officer, grade 2 (GSO2) in the 33rd Division.

The division was transferred to France in early 1916, in preparation for the summer offensive of that year. It moved into the line in February, and Pinney ordered a series of small raids in company or battalion strength through the following months. The 35th was deployed for the Battle of the Somme, assigned to XIII Corps in Fourth Army. It was held in reserve during the Battle of Albert, the opening phases of the attack in early July, but fought in the Battle of Bazentin Ridge and the subsequent attacks on High Wood, where it took heavy casualties; in a week, one brigade lost a thousand men, a third of its strength. The division rested for a week in early August, but returned to the line almost immediately. At the end of the month, a badly planned and potentially suicidal attack on Falfemont Farm was cancelled by Pinney at the last minute when the "facts were pointed out" by Montgomery, and a new plan substituted; the attacking battalion took the farm with light casualties. Following this, it was withdrawn to a quiet sector of the line.

"Good-morning; good-morning!" the General said
When we met him last week on our way to the line.
Now the soldiers he smiled at are most of 'em dead,
And we're cursing his staff for incompetent swine.
"He's a cheery old card," grunted Harry to Jack
As they slogged up to Arras with rifle and pack.

But he did for them both by his plan of attack.

— Siegfried Sassoon, "The General" (1917)

In September, Major-General Herman Landon, GOC of the neighbouring 33rd Division was relieved of his command. It was arranged that he would exchange with Pinney in the 35th Division, and the transfer was made on 23 September. The decision to rotate commanders appears to have been a desire to give Landon, four years older than Pinney, a less active command, as the 35th was occupying a relatively quiet sector; presumably, it was felt that Pinney was a more effective commander for an active division. When Pinney met the officers of one of his new battalions in early October 1916, they recorded that he seemed "pleasant and human", and "not too old".

However, some of his habits were unpopular; most gallingly to his men, he stopped the regular issue of rum in the division shortly after taking command, replacing it with tea instead. The infantry were greatly displeased, with one NCO describing him as "a bun-pinching crank, more suited to command of a Church Mission hut than troops". There was some justification to the jibe; as well as being teetotal, Pinney did not smoke, and was devoutly religious. The most lasting description of him was written in this period by Siegfried Sassoon, then an officer in one of the 33rd's battalions, who used Pinney as the subject of his satirical poem "The General".

The 33rd was a New Army division of the same wave as the 35th, but it had lost its original New Army composition; by late 1916, it was composed equally of Territorial, Regular and New Army battalions. Rather than the 35th's bantams, the 33rd had originally been formed from "Pals battalions", units drawn from local communities so that men could serve alongside their friends and colleagues, and the Public Schools Battalions, made up of former pupils of the elite public schools. Many of the initial units had been transferred out—or, in the case of the latter units, disbanded so that their men could be trained as officers—but a number of these close-knit units still remained in the division.

Following Pinney's arrival the division was withdrawn for two months to reorganise, missing the Battle of Flers-Courcelette, and saw some fighting in the very end of the fighting on the Somme when a "pretentious" plan produced by the divisional command to capture a German trench system at night failed. In January 1917 Pinney was awarded a Companion of the Order of the Bath (CB). The 33rd remained on the Somme front until March, when it was transferred to Amiens to participate in the Battle of Arras. Here, the division fought at the Second Battle of the Scarpe in late April, where it took 700 prisoners but suffered heavy losses. This was followed by a series of attacks on the Hindenburg Line in late May, the first of which, on the night of 20 May, was masterminded by Pinney—one observer noted that "his tail is right up over his back ... he was out for a gamble with his troops and he had it", though sadly added that despite its great success, he still refused to authorise an issue of rum. A second attack on 27 May was a complete failure; Pinney later explained the attack as having been a distraction in support of the coming Battle of Messines, an interpretation greeted with some cynicism by observers.

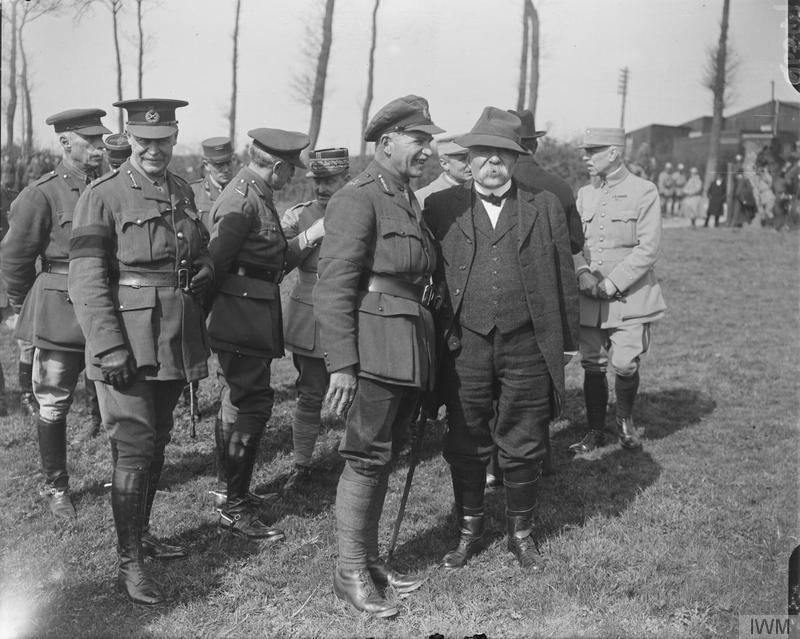
Major-General Reginald Pinney, commanding the 33rd Division, and Georges Clemenceau, the Prime Minister of France, inspecting elements of Pinney's 33rd Division at Cassel, France, 21 April 1918.

Following the fighting around Arras, the 33rd was moved to Nieuwpoort, Belgium, as part of the build-up for the planned Operation Hush, a breakthrough along the coastal front coupled with an amphibious landing behind German lines. After the operation was cancelled, the division remained at Niewpoort, where Pinney was hospitalised and temporarily relinquished command of the 33rd to Brigadier General Philip Wood. He remained in hospital for two months, during which time he missed heavy fighting by the 33rd at the Battle of Passchendaele. After the GOC VIII Corps, Lieutenant General Aylmer Hunter-Weston, had sacked the current divisional commander, Brigadier General Wood, for a perceived lack of aggression (unjustifiably, in Simon Robbins' view), Pinney returned to the division on 30 November, amid rumours that he had got the return posting through personal influence.

The division remained in reserve until April 1918, when German forces attacked as part of their spring offensive. During the Battle of the Lys, the Portuguese Expeditionary Corps (CEP) was effectively wiped out, leaving a two-mile wide gap in the British lines. The 33rd was ordered into position, and Pinney personally commanded the divisional machine-gun battalion, which—with the assistance of various stragglers from retreating units—helped turn back a heavy German attack at the Battle of Hazebrouck on 12 and 13 April. For his service in April, Pinney, along with the commanders of the 12th, 55th and 61st divisions, was appointed a Knight Commander of the Order of the Bath (KCB). The 33rd was used to train the U.S. 30th Division through the summer, but went over to the offensive in September, seeing action at the Battle of the St Quentin Canal, the Battle of Cambrai, and the Battle of the Selle. At the Selle, Pinney organised a dawn attack with improvised bridges, allowing the 33rd to force a bridgehead and successfully clear the opposing bank in a short time.

The division finished the war, which ended due to the Armistice of 11 November 1918, in the Sambre valley, and began demobilisation. In February 1919, with the division mostly demobilised, Pinney retired from the army, aged fifty-five, after thirty-five years of service.

Alongside Major General Sydney Lawford, GOC 41st Division and a fellow Royal Fusilier, Pinney was one of the longest serving divisional commanders in the BEF, maintaining continuous command of the 35th and 33rd divisions from September 1915 until February 1919.

== Retirement ==
Following the end of his career in the army, Pinney took up residence at Racedown Manor, in the village of Broadwindsor, Dorset, where he lived the life of a retired country gentleman. He became a justice of the peace and deputy lieutenant for the county, and served as its high sheriff in 1923. He did not return to an active army post, though he was the colonel of his old regiment, the Royal Fusiliers, effective from September 1924 when he took over from Major General Colin Donald, until 1933, and was honorary colonel of the Dorsetshire Coast Brigade, Royal Garrison Artillery (appointed 31 March 1921) and of the 4th (Territorial) Battalion of the Dorsetshire Regiment.

Pinney died at the age of 79 on 18 February 1943, survived by his wife and five of his children. All three of his sons served in the Second World War; his eldest son, Bernard, was killed in action in November 1941, commanding J Battery Royal Horse Artillery at Sidi Rezegh in North Africa. His daughter Rachel was one of a group of women who, as "Ferguson's Gang", hit the headlines in the interwar period with masked appearances with bags of money to save properties for the National Trust. A scholarship fund, to provide access to higher education for the children of Dorset ex-servicemen, was established in Pinney's name in June 1943, and remains in existence.

== Notes ==
Military offices
Preceded by New post	GOC 35th Division; 1915–1916	Succeeded by Herman Landon
Preceded by Herman Landon	GOC 33rd Division; 1916–1919	Succeeded by Philip Wood
Honorary titles
Preceded by Colin Donald	Colonel of the Royal Fusiliers; 1924–1933	Succeeded by Walter Hill
