= Rachel Pinney =

British developmental therapist

Rachel Pinney (11 July 1909 – 19 October 1995) was a British medical doctor who pioneered therapeutic approaches to children's development in the 1960s which she termed "Creative Listening" and "Children's Hours". From 1927 to 1934 she was a member of the clandestine Ferguson's Gang, a group of eccentric philanthropists who donated money to the National Trust and other rural conservation appeals. In her alter-ego as Red Biddy, Pinney, cloaked and masked, delivered Ferguson's Gang's first donation to the National Trust offices in 1933. The delivery of £100 in silver for the endowment of Shalford Mill to the National Trust was reported in The Times. Unorthodox in many ways, Pinney kept a vow of silence on Wednesdays, and was a committed peace activist.

== Life ==
Her father, Reginald Pinney, was a major-general in the British army. She obtained a medical degree and practiced as a GP until 1961, as well as acting s a police surgeon. She worked with the distinguished child therapist Dr. Margaret Lowenfeld, but never trained formally. She pioneered "methods for conflict understanding" which she called "Creative Listening" and "Children's Hours", the former incorporated as a limited company in 1967.

She toured Britain in the early 1960s inviting people to share their views on controversial subjects such as homosexual law reform and nuclear warfare while she used her structured listening technique.

One unusual habit, which gave her pleasure, was to tickle her eyelids with the point of a pin.

Her child techniques were widely used by experts working therapeutically with children.

In September 1970, she was sent to prison for nine months for the offence of keeping and maintaining a child out of England against his mother's will, after sending a 14-year-old boy to live in Canada without his mother's consent.

In 1977, Pinney went to New York and treated a four-year-old boy who had autism. This resulted in her publication Bobby, Breakthrough of an Autistic Child (1983).

She was briefly married to Luigi Cocuzzi with whom she had one daughter and two sons. She was a Quaker and a member of the Campaign for Nuclear Disarmament from 1961. She openly declared herself a lesbian in 1989.

She died on 19 October 1995 aged 86.

== Bibliography ==
- Rachel Pinney, Creative Listening (1970) ISBN 0950019216 ISBN 978-0950019215
- Rachel Pinney, Mimi Schlachter, Anthea Courtenay, Bobby: Breakthrough of a Special Child, HarperCollins (1983) ISBN 0002720493 ISBN 978-0002720496
