= Heelis =

Central office of the National Trust, in Swindon, England

Coordinates: 51.5637°N 1.7972°W

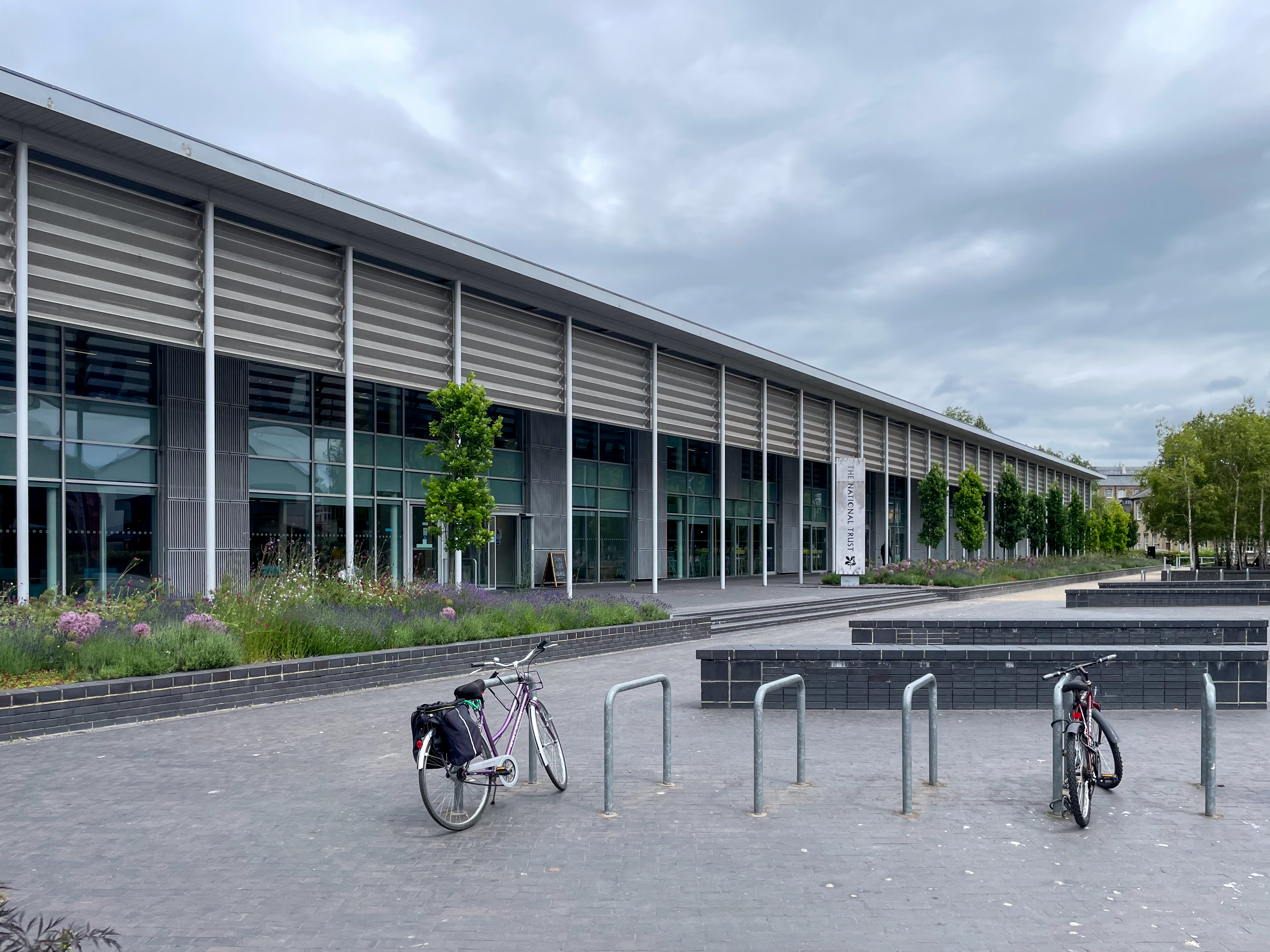
Heelis in 2024

Heelis is the central office of the National Trust, in Swindon, Wiltshire, England. Heelis was the married name of Beatrix Potter, one of the key figures in the early history of the National Trust.

It was built in 2005 by Feilden Clegg Bradley Studios. It is considered one of the greenest office buildings in England, incorporating silent, natural ventilation and open-plan meeting spaces.

== Gallery ==
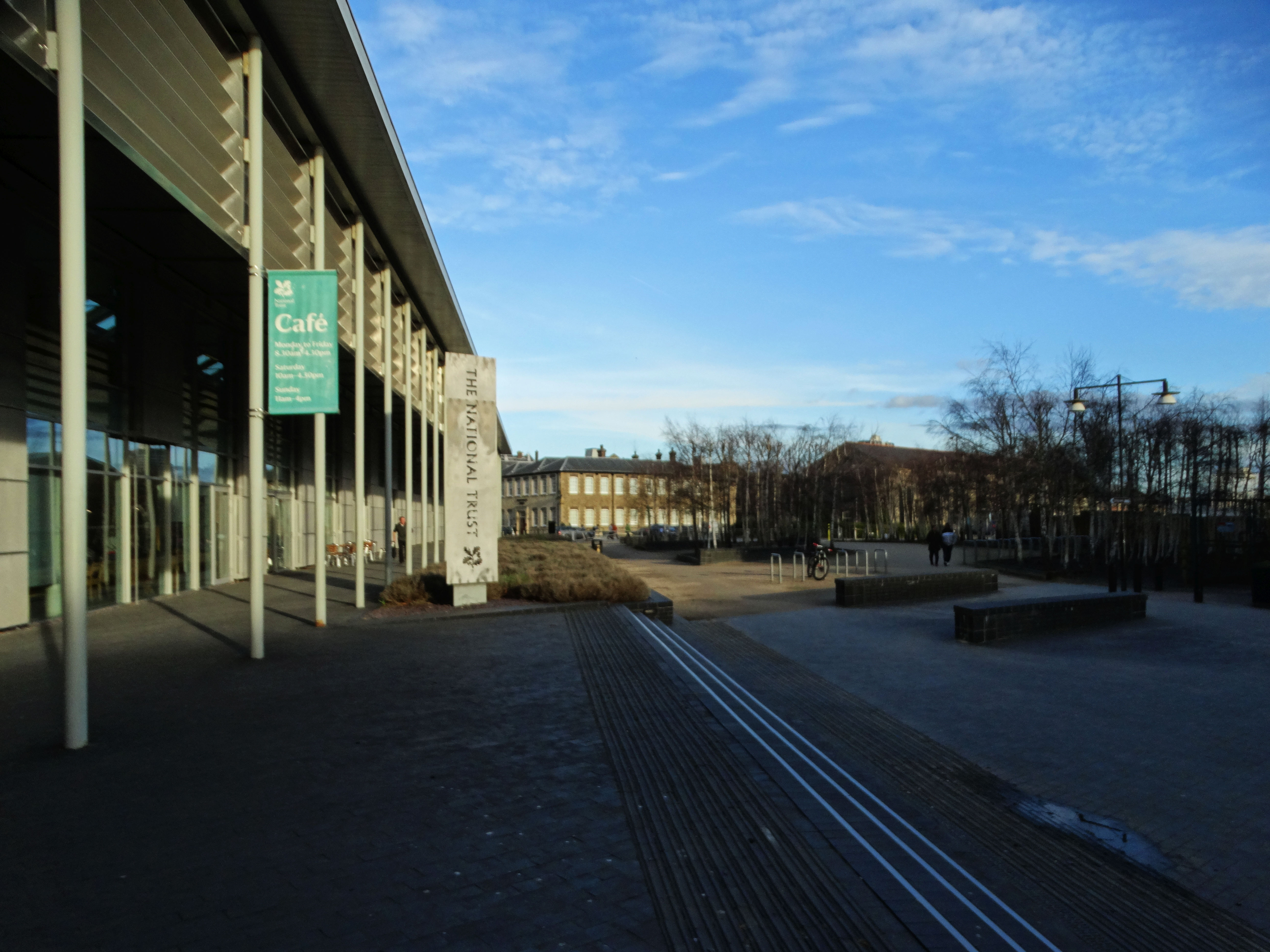
View of the National Trust Headquarters looking East

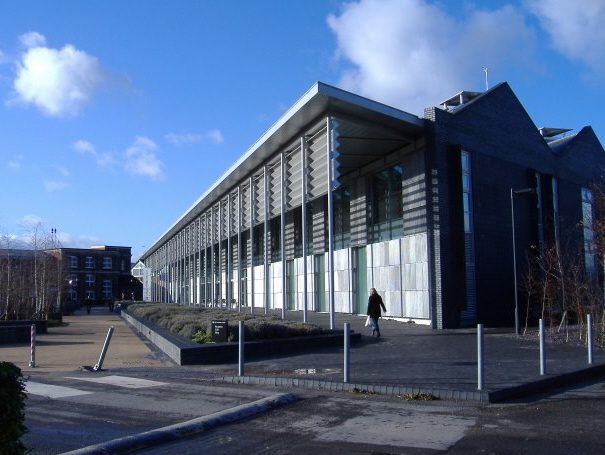
View of the National Trust Headquarters looking West

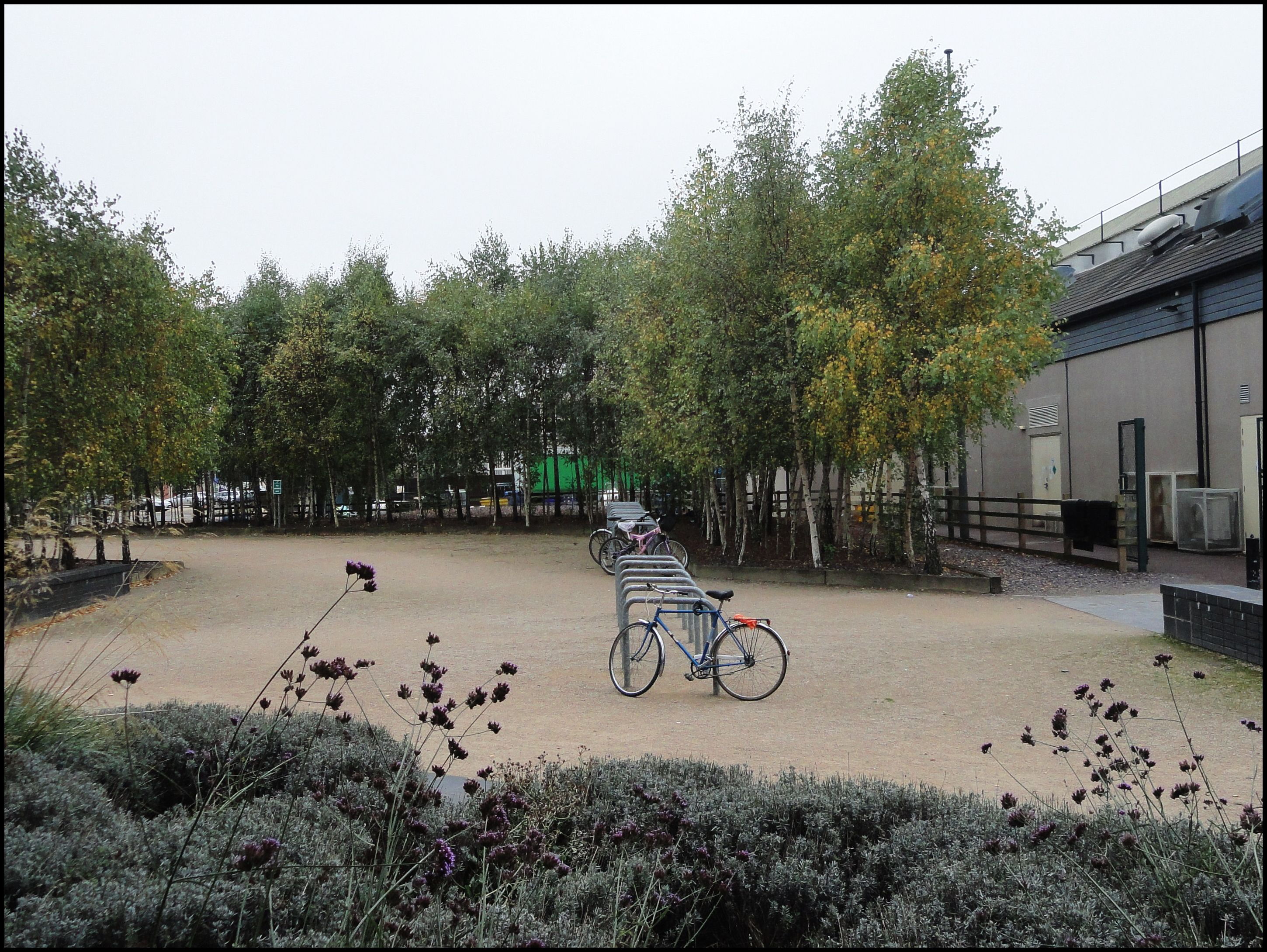
Bike park at the National Trust Headquarters

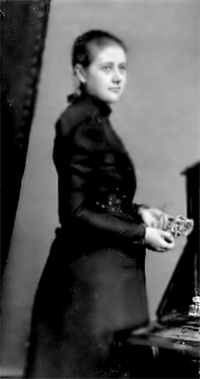
Beatrix Heelis (née Potter), a key figure in the early days of the National Trust
