= National Land Fund =

UK government cultural fund

The National Land Fund of the United Kingdom was a sum of money held by HM Treasury for the purpose of securing culturally significant property for the nation as a memorial to the dead of World War II. It was created in 1946.

Proposed by Chancellor of the Exchequer, Hugh Dalton, the fund was confirmed in section 48 of the Finance Act 1946 with a sum of £50 million.

The fund was never really utilised or developed in the manner that Dalton had envisaged. Nevertheless, despite this under-utilisation, substantial areas of land and numerous buildings were donated to various charities, of which a principal beneficiary was the National Trust which acquired many country houses in the 1940s and 1950s using the fund, beginning with Cotehele in Cornwall. Typically the houses were given to the nation instead of inheritance tax being paid to the Inland Revenue, which was reimbursed from the fund for any shortfall.

The value of the fund was reduced to £10 million in 1957 by HM Treasury. After this the fund was seen as insufficient to deal with the loss of country houses. The issue was highlighted by an exhibition at Victoria and Albert Museum in 1974 and the sale of Mentmore Towers in 1977. As a result the fund was abolished by the National Heritage Act 1980 and replaced with the National Heritage Memorial Fund.
