= Hilary McGrady =

Northern Irish arts and cultural activist

Hilary McGrady CBE (born 1966) is a Northern Irish arts and cultural activist and environmentalist. She became Director-General of the National Trust in March 2018.

== Early life and education ==
Born and raised in Lisburn in the south of County Antrim in Northern Ireland, McGrady grew up during The Troubles. McGrady's father was a builder, while her mother looked after Hilary and her two siblings. A career adviser at Wallace High School in Lisburn – where McGrady was educated – suggested she become a hairdresser, but she instead studied graphic design at art college.

== Career ==
After finishing her degree in graphic design, McGrady worked as a designer before moving into marketing, including as a brand manager for Diageo, the global drinks company. In 1998 she was appointed director of the NI branch of Arts & Business.

=== Belfast European Capital of Culture Bid ===
Following the departure of Shona McCarthy, McGrady joined the Imagine Belfast 2008 team as chief executive to lead Belfast's bid to become European Capital of Culture. The bid failed.

=== National Trust ===
In 2006 McGrady joined the National Trust as regional director for Northern Ireland. She later became Regional Director for Cymru / Wales and for the London and South East region. In 2014, she was appointed Chief Operating Officer, leading the Operations and Consultancy teams.

In December 2017 it was announced that McGrady would succeed Dame Helen Ghosh as Director-General of the Trust and she started the role in March 2018. She is the organisation's first Director-General not to have attended Oxbridge.

In 2020 the Trust celebrated its 125th anniversary, with McGrady announcing that the organisation would reach Net Zero carbon emissions by 2030, including the planting of 20 million trees. She also pledged to create 20 "green corridors" connecting urban areas with wilder countryside for people and nature. The first of these was announced in Bath in 2022.

The majority of the anniversary celebrations were cancelled due to the COVID-19 pandemic, with McGrady making a number of media interventions on the organisation's financial losses, and the need for a sustainable recovery.

The publication in 2020 of a research document exploring National Trust places' links with slavery and colonialism attracted controversy. In January 2022 McGrady revealed that she had received death threats, although she had not reported these to the police because, she said, such abuse "comes with the territory."

On 28 July 2023 McGrady was one of a number of signatories to an open letter to the Prime Minister expressing alarm about the UK Government's environmental policy. In her capacity as Director-General of the National Trust she said that the Trust's membership supported her in speaking up "for the future of life on this one precious planet" and warned that she would not "stand by whilst politicians use the environment as a political football".

== Personal life ==
McGrady lives in County Antrim with her husband, whom she met at art college. Their relationship initially caused difficulty for her family who were Protestants and unionists, while her husband came from a Catholic, nationalist area. They have three grown-up children. She lists her interests as the arts, gardening and hill walking.
