= Diana White (artist) =

English painter

Diana White (19 June 1868 – 21 January 1950) was a British artist and translator. She painted Impressionist-style landscapes and translated books authored in French and Danish into English. Her most sought-after work is the 1903 book The Descent of Ishtar, of which only 226 copies were printed.

== Life ==
Diana White was born on 19 June 1868 in Hackney, London, England. She was the daughter of Henry White and Anne Moate.

From around the age of 12 she attended Missender House Ladies School, on Dover Street in Ryde, Isle of Wight within a short walking distance from the Ryde School of Art. It is interesting to note that one of the teachers at the school, Marie Gervuex, was from Canton de Berne, Switzerland. She then moved back to London to live with her mother, who by then had been widowed, and to study art (c.1886–1891).

White, having never married, died on 21 January 1950. At that time she was living at Wotton Burwash Common, Sussex.

== Career ==
=== Artist ===
White painted still lifes and Impressionist-style landscapes. She studied at the Crystal Palace School of Art under Archibald Macgregor. Macgregor, an artist and architect, was father of John Macgregor. White's fellow student was Esther Bensusan, who later married Lucien Pissarro. Macgregor particularly admired White's features and she often sat for him. She remained close friends with both Macgregor and Bensusan throughout her life.

While a student White was awarded a certificate for watercolour painting (1886), a certificate and the Scholarship in Art for 1889-90 for a model in plaster (1889), and a silver medal for 'head modelled from the life' (1890).'

==== The Pissarros: Esther, Lucien and Orovida ====
Her friendship with the Pissarros began with Esther while they were both students at the Crystal Palace School of Art. Esther met Lucien Pissarro on his first visit to London in 1883. Lucien returned to London in 1890 and married Esther two years later. Through Esther, White also became a friend of Lucien, who was devoted to Impressionism.

In time, White became a trusted friend and mentor to Esther and Lucien's daughter, Orovida Pissarro. Over the years, White and Orovida exchanged hundreds of letters discussing art, theory, philosophy and literature. Although White was a follower of Lucien, she had her doubts about Impressionism. She wrote to Orovida:

Everyday I feel more certain that impressionism took a wrong turn in that it ignored that art is art and not nature...I would not, for the world depress your father by stating my convictions. - Diana White, c.1916

White advised Orovida to study Palaeothic cave drawings, Chinese paintings, Persian miniatures, and a wide range of other art, insisting on the supremacy of Chinese art and art theory. Orovida became an outlet for White's philosophical discourses on art as Orovida found herself freer than White to reject Impressionism. White and Orovida planned a joint exhibition but it never materialised. She wrote to Orovida:

We must have a two woman show next year and show 'The London Group' a thing or two. I should dearly like to give them a real reason for hating me, which up to now I think they have lacked, would it not be a heavenly lark!...Oh work hard, hard, hard and we'll make them sit up. – Diana White, 1914

Lucien had proposed that White be included in a group exhibition at the Carfax Gallery in 1914. When a student from Sickert was chosen in her place, Lucien threatened to withdraw, and the committee promptly admitted two of White's paintings. The Manchester Courier wrote that while the other exhibitors "illustrate various phases of Impressionism, Miss Diana White asserts her individuality with some clever drawings". It is possible that Lucien's reaction, to White's initial exclusion from the Carfax Gallery exhibition, could be explained, at least in part, by circumstances preceding the event. Walter Sickert had been associated with the Carfax Gallery from the start. At the time it was known for exhibiting work of the Camden Town Group, a group who declared itself a "male club" where women were not eligible. Both Lucien and Sickert were members. According to Charles Ginner, Sickert was one of two that introduced the ban of women members. In 1911, Esther requested that White be elected a member of the Camden Town Group but her request was denied.

I admire Miss White's work & I am sorry it has been rejected by the N.E.A.C. especially as there are a lot of bad pictures there.... It is difficult to make a woman a member off-hand especially as the time is so limited before the next exhibition...But I see no reason why the Group should not give Miss White a special invitation to exhibit without actually making her a member until the matter has been discussed at a meeting. - James Bolivar Manson, 1911

After Lucien died, Orovida returned to naturalism and to oil paints. On hearing of Orovida tackling a new line of art and her return to oils, White wrote to her, "Beloved OCP, what glorious news that you have taken to oils, how joyous, and how much I envy you."

==== Exhibitions ====
She exhibited frequently at the Goupil Gallery (1908 – 1922) and also exhibited at the:

- Royal Albert Hall (1908)
- Galleries of the Royal Society of British Artists (1909–1913)
- Dore Gallery (1914)
- Whitechapel Art Gallery (1914)
- Carfax Gallery (1914)

At the first exhibition or "Salon" of the Allied Artists' Association held at the Royal Albert Hall in 1908, White showed five water colour drawings, seven pen and ink drawings, five chalk drawings, and two watercolour paintings; An Essex Cottage and A Road in Norfolk. Each exhibitor was limited to showing a total of five works. White "framed" her drawings into three groups of five or seven individual drawings. So, although she showed 19 individual drawings and paintings, these three groups and two paintings formed only five exhibits.

She also showed for three years in the Exhibition for Modern Pictures (New English Art Club, 1909-1913), the Post-Impressionist and Futurist Exhibition (Dore Gallery, 1914), and the Twentieth Century Art. A Review of Modern Movements (Whitechapel Art Gallery, 1914).

=== Translator ===
==== French to English ====
Her first and last translations were for books written in French: Tombouctou la Mystérieuse and Album de Poèmes tirés du Livre de Jade.

In Tombouctou la Mystérieuse, Felix Dubois wrote about his travels along The Niger, Jenne, Songhois, Sudan and to Timbuktu. He described the commerce, life, politics, literature and people of the places he visited.

Timbuctoo the Mysterious...An indescribably fascinating book of travel almost reflecting as much credit on the translator as on the author. It is being widely read. – The National Review, 1897.

Album de Poèmes tirés du Livre de Jade, translated into French from the original Chinese, by Judith Gautier was first published in 1911 by Eragny Press (see The Descent of Ishtar below). Gautier's book included a preface by White. White wrote her version in English, Preface to an Album of Poems from the Livre de Jade, which was reprinted privately (only 60 copies) for Orovida Pissarro in 1948.

==== The Descent of Ishtar ====
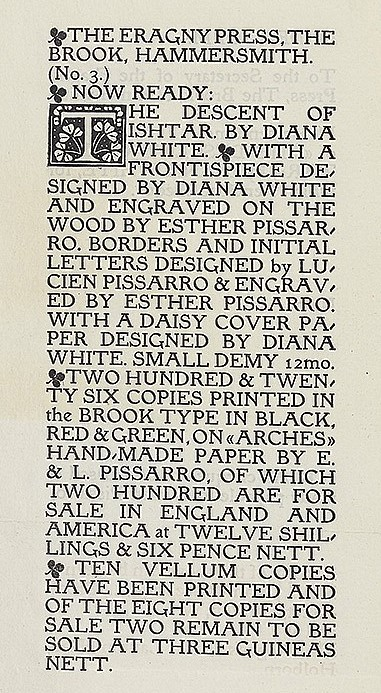
Image of page from The Descent of Ishtar by Diana White, Eragny Press 1903

Because of its rarity, her most sought after book is The Descent of Ishtar, or Ishtar's descent to the nether world. Only 226 copies were printed. and was printed by Eragny Press which was established by Lucien Pissarro and his wife Esther (née Bensusan). White's book is a translation of the Seventh Tablet in the Deluge Series and is the story of Inanna-Ishtar's descent into the Underworld. White is attributed as the translator however she relied on others to translate the tablet and then "prepared [it] for the press".

Cuneform being a closed book to me, I wish to express my entire indebtedness for the present version of the legend to its various translators: Mr. George Smith, Professor Sayce, Professor Shrader, and MM. Joachim Menant, Julius Oppert, and Francois Lenormant – D[iana] W[hite], 1897

Translators had been working on the tablet for some years before White published her book in 1903. George Smith, for example, had relied on Fox Talbot's translation, as well as others, and first published his translation of it in 1872 in The Daily Telegraph. However, in writing and "preparing" her book it may be that some translation was required from French or German. The book's colophon states that the frontispiece was "designed by Diana White & engraved on the wood by Esther Pissarro. The double border and initial letters were designed by Lucien Pissarro and engraved by Esther Pissarro." The book is 30 pages of poetry and illustrations in Art Nouveau design. At the time it received mixed reviews:

On...'The Descent of Ishtar,' by Diana White, both the decoration (or undecoration) border and the woodcut seem to us failures, nor are we able to admire by any means all the specimen illustrations...modelled on that by Mr. Cockrell of Morris's. But the book tells an interesting story, and is worth buying by everyone who cares for modern experiments in printing.' – The Library, 1905

== Collections ==
- The Ashmolean Museum of Art and Archaeology

== Books ==
=== French to English ===
- Timbuctoo the Mysterious, by Felix Dubois. Translated by Diana white (1896)
- Preface to an Album of Poems from the Livre de Jade, by Diana White (1948)

=== Danish to English ===
- William Shakespeare: A Critical Study, by Georg Brandes – Third Book translated by Diana White with the assistance of Mary Morison (1898)
- Main Currents in Nineteenth Century Literature – Vol 1. The Emigrant Literature, by Georg Brandes. Translated by Diana White and Mary Morison (1905)
- Main Currents in Nineteenth Century Literature – Vol 2. The Romantic School in Germany, by Georg Brandes. Translated by Diana White and Mary Morison (1905)
- Main Currents in Nineteenth Century Literature – Vol 3. The Reaction in France, by Georg Brandes. Translated by Diana White and Mary Morison (1905)
- Main Currents in Nineteenth Century Literature – Vol 4. Naturalism in England, by Georg Brandes. Translated by Diana White and Mary Morison (1905)
- Main Currents in Nineteenth Century Literature – Vol 5. The Romantic School in France, by Georg Brandes. Translated by Diana White and Mary Morison (1905)
- Main Currents in Nineteenth Century Literature – Vol 6. Young Germany, by Georg Brandes. Translated by Diana White and Mary Morison (1905)

=== Various to English ===
- The Descent of Ishtar, by Diana White (1903)
