= Newtown Old Town Hall =

Municipal building in Newtown, Isle of Wight, England

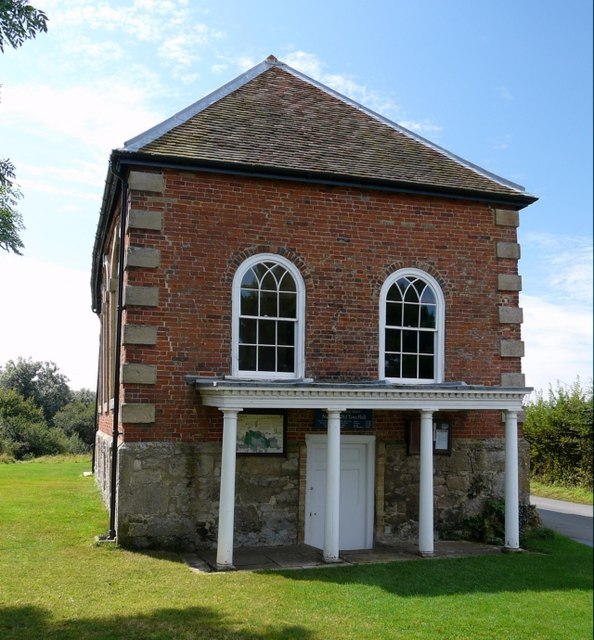
- Newtown Old Town Hall

- Shown on the Isle of Wight
- 50.7131°N 1.4012°W
- Location: Town Lane, Newtown

History
- Built: 1699

Site notes
- Architectural style: Tudor style
- Website: www.nationaltrust.org.uk/newtown-old-town-hall

Listed Building – Grade II*
- Official name: Newtown Town Hall
- Designated: 18 January 1967
- Reference no.: 1209336

The Old Town Hall is a municipal building in the High Street in Town Lane, Newtown, Isle of Wight, England. The structure, which is used as a tourist attraction, is a Grade II* listed building. Newtown is now a small village, and its town hall is owned by the National Trust.

== History ==
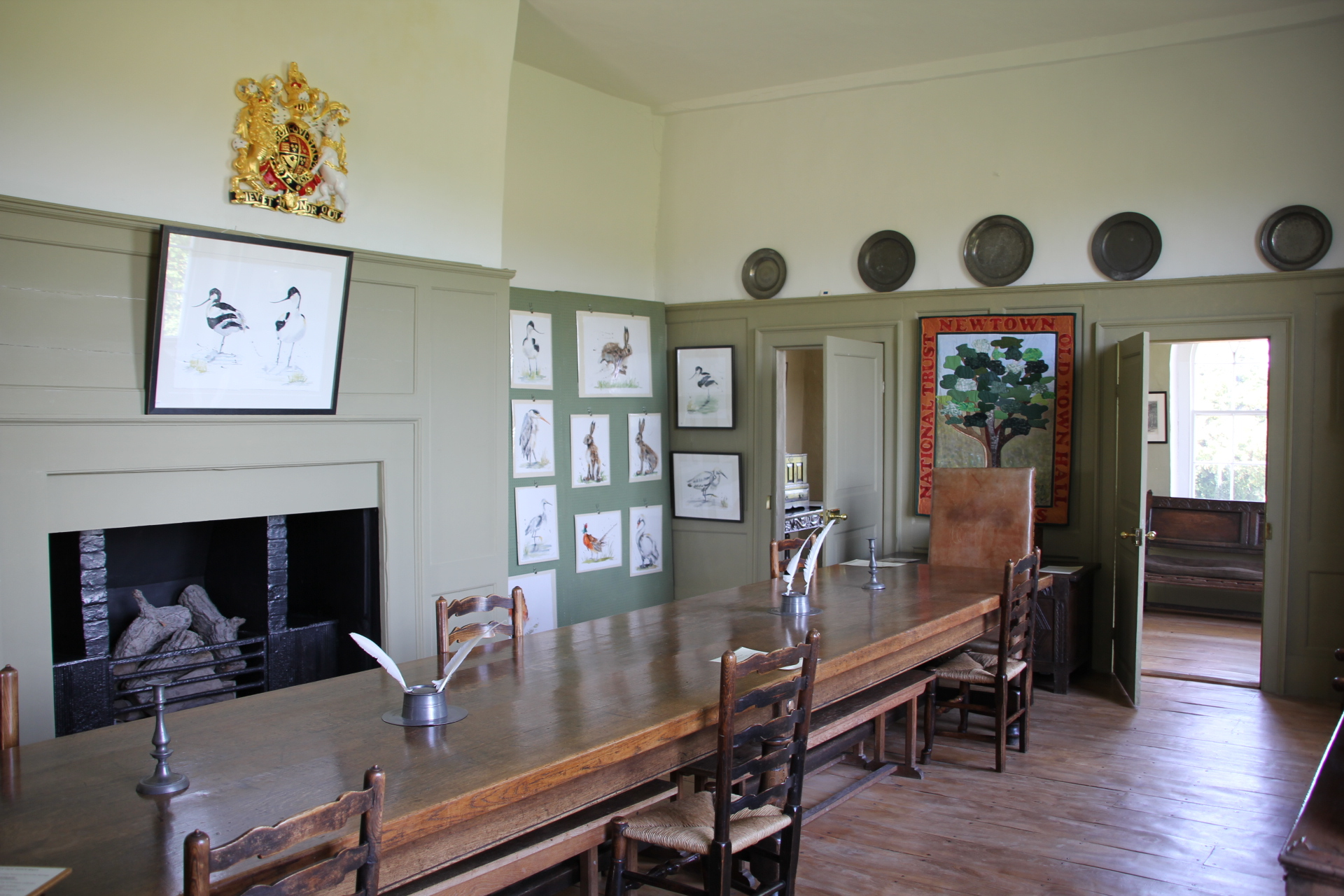
Meeting room

Newtown developed as a commercial centre and a borough in the 14th century. However, it failed to recover after a French raid in 1377 and Queen Elizabeth I awarded the town two parliamentary seats to try to stimulate economic development in 1584. In the late 17th century, the mayor and burgesses decided to commission a town hall in order to be able to exercise the privileges afforded to them of holding dinners at which they would confirm the names of the candidates for the two seats.

The new building was designed in the Tudor style, built in red brick and was completed in around 1699. The design involved a symmetrical main frontage with two bays facing north along Town Lane; there was a doorway on the ground floor and two rounded headed windows on the first floor. The south-facing frontage featured a doorway on the first floor accessed by an external stone staircase, while the east front featured four casement windows on the ground floor and four round headed windows on the first floor; the west front was completely plain. Internally, the principal rooms were the council chamber and the mayor's parlour.

Members of parliament who were chosen in the town hall included the future prime minister, George Canning, in 1806. A portico with four Tuscan order columns supporting a modillioned cornice and a canopy was added in 1813. Newtown had a very small electorate which was dominated by three families (the Barrington, Holmes and Anderson-Pelham families), which meant it was recognised by the UK Parliament as a rotten borough. Its right to elect members of parliament was removed by the Reform Act 1832, and its borough council, which had effectively been extinct from 1835, was formally abolished under the Municipal Corporations Act 1883.

After many years of decline and neglect the building was repaired in 1933 under the supervision of John Eric Miers Macgregor, a specialist conservation architect who managed to save the derelict structure. The repair was funded by Ferguson's Gang, a mysterious group of young, anonymous, women benefactors who endowed Newtown Old Town Hall to the National Trust and agreed for it to be run as a Youth Hostel for fifteen years. An exhibition of the exploits of the Gang was put on display in the building, which became a local tourist attraction, open to the public during the summer months.
