= John Eric Miers Macgregor =

British architect (1890–1984)

John Eric Miers Macgregor FRIBA FSA OBE (4 October 1890 – 31 January 1984) was a British conservation architect with the Society for the Protection of Ancient Buildings. He was appointed an OBE in 1964 and the Esher Award in 1974 for his contribution to the repair of historic buildings.

== Early life and education ==
Macgregor was born in Chiswick, London. He was the son of Archibald Macgregor, an artist in the pre-Raphaelite tradition. His mother Ellen Macgregor (née Miers), was an active suffragist and political candidate for Bedford Park, London establishing one of the first infant welfare centres at Ravenscourt House in Hammersmith, London. The family lived at Stamford Brook House, London with Macgregor’s two brothers, Alex and Norman.

Macgregor attended Westminster School from age 14 to 17 years. He suffered from undiagnosed dyslexia, which held him back academically with the result that he had to repeat a year. School worship at Westminster Abbey inspired Macgregor to train as an architect. His difficulty with conventional learning had hidden benefits and he became a master of lateral thinking, often coming up with unconventional and innovative ways to solve architectural problems.

== Career ==
Macgregor trained with Fred Rowntree & Sons in Hammersmith Terrace, where he developed an interest in modern functional architecture, before studying for two years with the Architectural Association.

Macgregor’s talent was spotted early on and at the age of 22 he was employed by William Weir, with whom he shared lodgings, to help rebuild and repair Tattershall Castle. The experience laid the foundations for Macgregor’s conservation career.

The Society for the Protection of Ancient Buildings regularly employed him to survey properties and oversee their repair and it was through them that he was recommended to the National Trust.

In 1931 he surveyed Shalford Mill in Surrey for the eccentric group of women philanthropists, Ferguson’s Gang who endowed the watermill to the National Trust in 1932. He supervised the repair of the building and after converting half of the watermill into residential quarters the Macgregor’s leased it as their weekend home. Ferguson’s Gang had their headquarters in one room of the mill. They employed Macgregor for two further conservation projects, Newtown Old Town Hall on the Isle of Wight and Priory Cottages in Oxfordshire. A celebrated member of their Gang, he was more to them than simply an architect and given the name of the ‘Artichoke’. One moonlit night in 1935, Macgregor and his friend the independent reformist MP, A. P. Herbert took members of the Gang on Herbert’s barge The Water Gypsy down the River Thames to collect water samples from the underground tributaries of the Thames. The samples collected in five cut-glass water bottles are kept at Shalford Mill today.

Macgregror mentored architects and surveyors in conservation through the SPAB’s Scholarship Scheme, and became chairman of its technical panel.

He illustrated Repair of Ancient Buildings, written by his business partner A. R. Powys (Secretary of the SPAB). Macgregor’s contribution to the repair of historic buildings includes well known buildings such as Tattershall Castle in Lincolnshire, Montacute House in Somerset, William Hogarth’s house in Chiswick as well as many lesser known buildings such as St Paul’s Saxon church in Elsted, Sussex. He designed modern buildings to sit comfortably alongside historic houses such as the Squash Court at Rivercourt House, Upper Mall, Hammersmith and designed a radical ziggurat style social housing block, Lennox House in Bethnal Green, London, in 1934, both of which are now Grade II listed.

== First World War Service and Family Life ==
Macgregor joined the Artists' Rifles and fought in northern France until 1917 when he was demobbed after being gassed.

The following year, Macgregor married Janet Udale in 1918. They set up home in a derelict Georgian house at 7 St Peter’s Square in Chiswick, West London which he repaired. They had four daughters: Janet Ellen in 1919, Penelope in 1921, and twins Joanna and Sally in 1926.

The Macgregors were part of a flourishing artistic and socially minded community. Janet Macgregor worked with her mother-in-law Ellen Macgregor in child and family welfare and produced plays with the writer Naomi Mitchison at the Mercury Theatre, Notting Hill to raise funds for family planning. They put on plays by the wit and writer G. K. Chesterton in the garden of Stamford Brook House and co-hosted debates with the artists Lucien Pissarro and Esther Pissarro who lived next door.

== Second World War ==
In 1942 Macgregor wrote several articles for the Builder magazine (now called Building), illustrating his ideas for an innovative post-war transport infrastructure across London.

Macgregor drafted plans for the post-war reconstruction of major cities and advised the War Damage Commission. He identified the need to record and list damaged historic buildings instigating an ad hoc committee with William Ansell, then President of the Royal Institute of British Architects (RIBA), art historian, Sir Kenneth Mckenzie Clark and architect Walter Godfrey, who became first director of the National Buildings Record, now the English Heritage Archive.

Macgregor was made a Fellow of the Royal Institute of British Architects (FRIBA). His daughter Penelope Adamson practiced alongside her father and both received the Esher Award for advancing the cause of building conservation.
