= Russell Jan Pinney =

American insurance industry expert

- Born: December 11, 1946 (age 79); United States
- Other name: Jan Pinney
- Occupations: Businessman, public speaker, insurance industry consultant
- Known for: Advocating for common-sense insurance regulation and national attention for various issues during his tenure on School district board

Jan Pinney, CLU, ChFC, CPCU (born December 11, 1946) is an American businessman, author, speaker, and insurance consultant.

He received national attention for various issues discussed during his tenure on the Roseville Joint Union High School District Board of Trustees in California. He has also testified before Assembly and Senate committees on insurance and finance.

Jan is a prominent and active figure within the American insurance industry where he advocates at the State and National levels for common-sense laws, transparency in regulatory oversight, and a consumer-first focus on insurance company product designs, sales distribution, and consumer protection.

He has led a coalition of NAILBA, LIDMA, and NAIFA leaders in fighting for an insurance agent exemption to the Telephone Consumer Protection Act of 1991 that prevents a licensed agent from contacting a consumer (their client) regarding an existing insurance policy via telephone without written permission. Under these rules, agents could only have telephone contact with their clients without written permission for a period of 18-months from the inception of a new insurance policy or were subject to fines.

== Early life and military service ==
Pinney was born December 11, 1946. He was drafted into the U.S. Army in 1966 where he attended Officer Candidate School after finishing Basic and Advanced Infantry training, and was commissioned an officer at age 20. His active duty service included assignment as the Deputy Provost Marshal of Fort Rucker, Alabama, while a lieutenant. He later served in the California National Guard where his service included commanding a Mechanized Infantry Company and serving as Battalion S1, both while a captain.

== Career ==
In 1972, Russell Jan Pinney began his first life insurance agency—the R. Jan Pinney General Agency of Transamerica Occidental Life Insurance Company. In 1975, it was incorporated as Pinney Insurance Center, Inc. It was a life insurance brokerage general agency, serving over 26,000 life insurance agents nationwide, and representing over 60 life insurance companies.

In 1985, Pinney merged the property and casualty portion of Pinney Insurance with the John A. Francis Insurance Agency to create Francis-Pinney Insurance Associates, Inc. In 1997, Pinney affiliated with ISU, a national property and casualty insurance marketing group and became ISU Francis-Pinney Insurance Services, Inc.

In 2002, Pinney created an online consumer-based life insurance website called Wholesale Insurance. Pinney's WholesaleInsurance.net and TrustedQuote.com are life insurance websites where consumers can compare rates from various life insurance companies at the same time.

In 2012, Pinney became an Executive Lead at Insureio, a tech start-up building a Customer relationship management (CRM) for life insurance agents. Formerly DataRaptor, Insureio launched a beta version to select agents and advisors in October 2013. In 2014, Insureio acquired the rights to Pinney Insurance's EZLifeSales platform, with more than 9,000 individual users. In October 2016, the company reached a milestone of over 100,000 unique leads received and processed by its users. In September 2017, the company was named a finalist for the 2017 LIDMA Innovation Award.

Pinney served for five years as a member of the board of directors, and Vice President of LifeMark Partners, a "single production source comprised nationally of 43 independent life brokerage agencies". (LifeMark is now LIBRA Insurance Partners, with 95 independent brokerage agencies.)

== Other positions ==
Pinney served as the Life Insurance Direct Marketers Association (LIDMA) 2018 - 2019 President.

Pinney served as president of the Sacramento Association of Life Underwriters from 1990 to 1991 and as president of NAIFA California from 2004 to 2005.

Pinney served as Membership Chair of the National Association of Independent Life Brokerage Agencies (NAILBA) and as a member of The International Forum and the Association For Advanced Life Underwriting (AALU).

Pinney joined the Board of Directors of the non-profit Life Happens as of January 1, 2022.

== School boards ==
In 1995, Pinney was appointed to the Roseville Joint Union High School District Board of Trustees to fill a vacant seat. He was reelected in 1996, 2000, 2004, 2008 and 2012, serving for 21 1/2 years on the school board. He served as board president in 1998–1999, 2001–2003, 2005–2006, 2009–2010, and 2013–2014. After his final board meeting in 2016, the Roseville Joint Union High School District Superintendent Ron Severson wrote, "He was a catalyst for the adoption of International Baccalaureate, for the effort to increase A-G completion, and for the Equal Opportunity Schools effort to expand our Advanced Placement programs."

During his time there he voted against the controversial "Quality Science Education Policy", keeping anti-evolution theories from being taught (against state laws) in local high schools.

He voted against allowing students to be released from school without parent's knowledge or consent for confidential medical treatments.

Pinney was a founding board member of the Eureka Schools Foundation, which marked its 25th year of service in 2017.

Pinney was appointed to the Board of Directors of the Placer County Office of Education in February 2022. In November 2022, he ran for a 4-year term and was elected.

== Recognition ==
- As of 2023, Russell Jan Pinney is a 48-year Life and Qualifying Member of the Million Dollar Round Table, and a 20-year member of the Top of the Table. To be a member of Top of the Table requires "producing at a level six times that of MDRT membership requirements."
- In 2021, Pinney received the LIDMA Vision Award, which "recognizes people and organizations that make substantial contributions to the advancement of the direct response segment of the life insurance industry."
- Pinney was recognized as Distinguished Trustee by the Placer County School Boards Association in 1999, 2003 and 2014.
- In 2011, Pinney received the Distinguished Service Award from NAIFA California.
- Pinney received commendations from Governor Arnold Schwarzenegger in 2005, Senator Dave Cox in 2005, Senator Ted Gaines in 2011 and Assembly Member Roger Niello in 2005 for his service to the insurance industry and the community.
- Pinney was awarded the Army Commendation Medal during active duty service as a lieutenant on assignment as the Deputy Provost Marshal of Fort Rucker, Alabama.
- Pinney was awarded the California Commendation Medal for his service as a captain in the California National Guard.

== Mentions ==
- Russell Jan Pinney was featured in Comstock's magazine in 2016, in an article titled "In Whom We Trust."
- Pinney was quoted in an article titled "The BGA business model in 2017 and beyond" on ThinkAdvisor.com.
- Pinney was quoted on the issue of senior supplements (cognitive testing) often required to submit a senior's life insurance application in "'Senior Supplements' On The Rise In Life Insurance Applications" on ThinkAdvisor.com.
- Pinney was quoted in the national magazine Advisor Today articles "Making Your Business a Top-Flight Operation" and "Know Your Score".
- Pinney has been quoted numerous times in the Sacramento Bee.

== Government testimonies ==
In 2017, Pinney testified before the California Senate Insurance Committee, The California Department of Insurance, and the Association of California Life and Health Insurance Companies.

In 2005, he spoke along with California Insurance Commissioner John Garamendi and ACLI President and former Governor John Keating before the California Assembly, State Senate and Department of Insurance.

== Other interests ==
Pinney is a Distinguished Past President of the Sacramento Suburban Kiwanis Club where his focus was on youth programs and he served as Assistant District Chair for the Boy Scouts of America.
