= The General (poem) =

Poem by Siegfried Sassoon

The General

"Good-morning, good-morning!" the General said
When we met him last week on our way to the line.
Now the soldiers he smiled at are most of 'em dead,
And we're cursing his staff for incompetent swine.
"He's a cheery old card," grunted Harry to Jack
As they slogged up to Arras with rifle and pack.

But he did for them both by his plan of attack.

The General is a war poem by the English war poet Siegfried Sassoon that takes place in the First World War, in the Battle of Arras. Written in April 1917 from Sassoon's hospital bed in London while recovering from a shoulder wound received while leading a bombing assault, the poem is about a general who greets soldiers as they arrive at the front lines. That was a week ago and now most of the soldiers are dead. The surviving soldiers curse at his lack of competence. One soldier, Harry, says to Jack, another soldier, that he is surprisingly cheery given that soldiers march onto war. The poem ends by telling us that Harry and Jack were killed directly due to the general's battle plans.

== Analysis ==
A version of The General by Siegfried Sassoon written on February 7, 1919

Consisting of two stanzas, it has a tone that is stern and satirical as the General sounds unusually jovial in the first verse ("good-morning, good-morning"), but the rest of the poem is shown from the soldier's points of view (specifically Harry and Jack's) and is depicted as bitter, hopeless and dark. There is also a reference to the Battle of Arras in the poem. The poem concludes with the stark statement "he did for them both by his plan of attack".

== Legacy ==
In 2017, another handwritten poem version written by Sassoon on 7 February 1919 would end up going on display at the Imperial War Museum in London, in an anti-war protest exhibition.
