= Ferguson's Gang =

20th-century fundraising collective

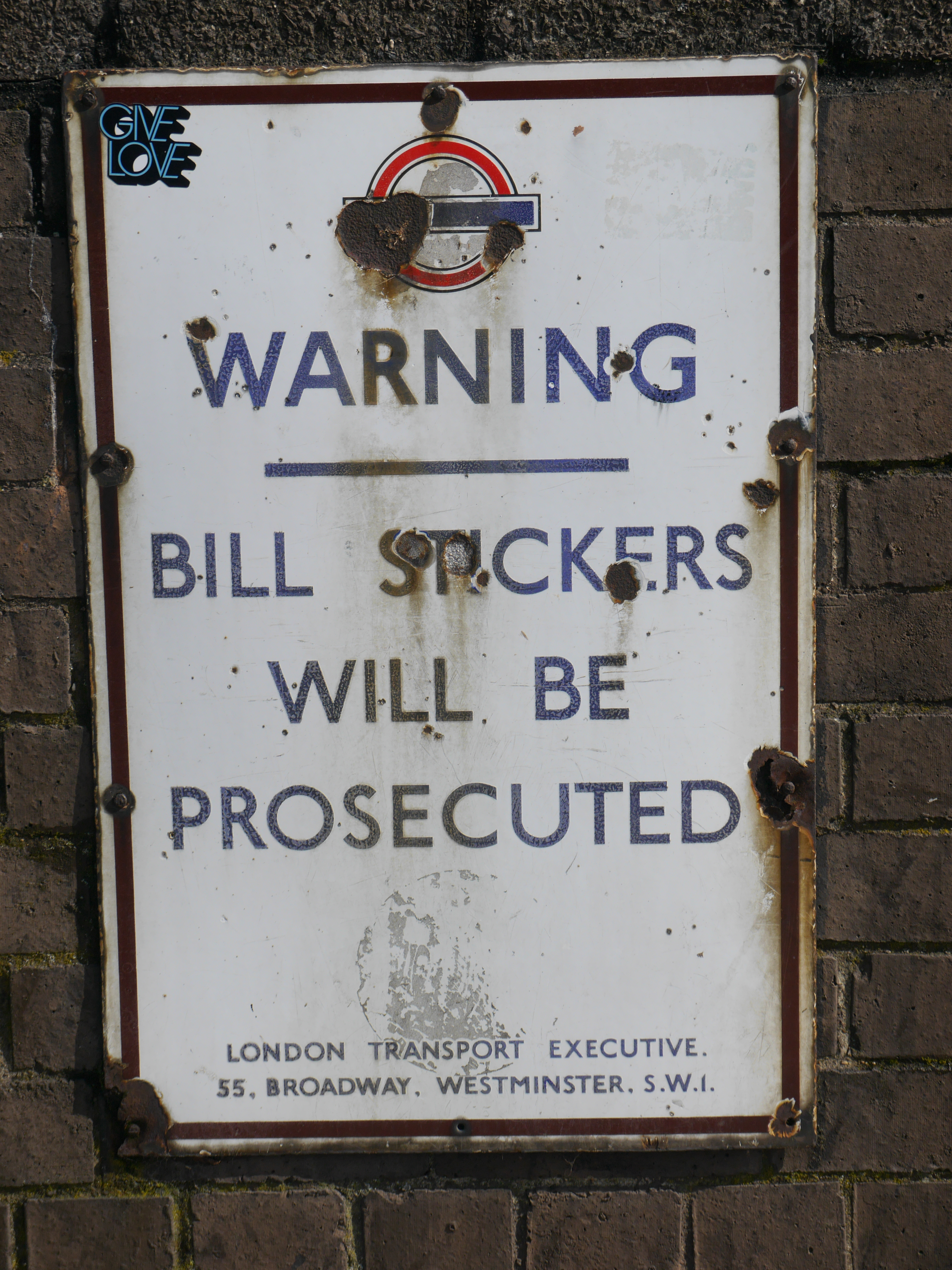
An example of a "Bill stickers will be prosecuted" sign of the type from which the leader took her pseudonym

Ferguson's Gang, formed during a picnic at Tothill Fields in London in 1927, was an anonymous and somewhat enigmatic group that raised funds for the National Trust from 1930 to 1947.

The members hid their identities behind resplendent masks, punny pseudonyms, and mock-Cockney communiqués. Bill Stickers was the leader (there was no actual "Ferguson"), taking her nom de guerre from the commonplace signs in Britain that discourage putting up illegal posters on buildings: "Bill stickers will be prosecuted". The inner circle was composed of five other young society women: Sister Agatha; Kate O'Brien The Nark; Red Biddy (a.k.a. White Biddy); The Lord Beershop of the Gladstone Islands and Mercator's Projection (The Bloody Beershop, or Is B); and Shot Biddy.

The gang was influenced by Clough Williams-Ellis's publication England and the Octopus, which denounced insensitive building and ugly development. They determined to save what they could. Their donations enabled the purchase of Shalford Mill, in Surrey, and Newtown Old Town Hall, on the Isle of Wight. The gang convinced the owner of Shalford Mill, Robert Arthur Godwin-Austen (1863–1948), to sell the mill to them. They included him in the gang, giving him the nickname, "Pious Yudhishtira". Conservation work was overseen by the Gang's architect John Eric Miers Macgregor, nicknamed The Artichoke. They also funded the purchase of stretches of the coastline of Cornwall, Priory Cottages at Steventon in Berkshire (now Oxfordshire), and supported appeals for money to purchase land in Derbyshire, the Lake District, Devon and Wiltshire. In total they directly raised the sum of £4,500, the equivalent to £500,000 in 2008, but as their antics were publicized and raised public awareness of their cause, donations came pouring in to the National Trust.

As an example of their methods, in January 1933, a fully masked Red Biddy, now known to be the developmental psychologist and peace activist Rachel Pinney, deposited a large sack of Victorian coins to the value of £100 on the Trust secretary's desk. It was to be the first installment of paying the £300 endowment on the 18th-century Shalford Water Mill on the Tillingbourne in Surrey. In December of the same year, another masked figure, 'Erb the Smasher, presented the secretary with 200 one-pound notes and "an illuminated sealed document" discharging the debt to the National Trust.

One gang member penned the gang's anthem:

We aint so many, We aint so few:
All of us has this end in view–
National Trust to work for you.

Green grass turning to bricks and dust,
Stately homes that will soon go bust–
No defence but the National Trust.

Looking at rural England thus
George and Dragon is change for us
Into St. Clough and the Octopus.

Ferguson's gang has paid its debt
Ferguson's obligation met:
Ferguson's Gang has more for you yet.

When the Cambridge Sanskrit scholar and adopted Cornish bard Margaret Steuart Pollard died at the age of 93 in 1996, her obituaries revealed that she had been Bill Stickers.

In 2018, as part of its nationwide "Women in Power" campaign, the National Trust commissioned "Saved by Ferguson's Gang" flags, hand stamps for visitors, and octopus-themed graphic designs at the various historic sites they rescued. In September 2018, the Trust supported a musical production of the gang's story at the Yvonne Arnaud Theatre in Guildford.

== Sources ==
- Bagnall, Polly (2012). Ferguson- Exhibition Catalogue.
