= Shalford Mill =

18th-century watermill in Shalford, Surrey, England

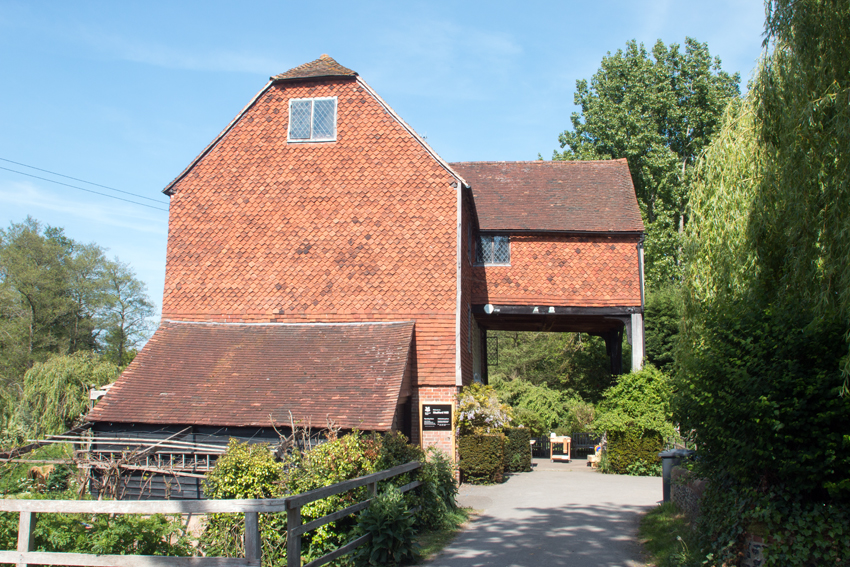
- View of the mill from the west.

- Location within Surrey
- 51°13′09″N 0°34′05″W
- Type: Watermill
- Location: Shalford, Surrey
- OS grid reference: TQ 00106 47635

History
- Built: 18th Century

Site notes
- Owner: National Trust

Listed Building – Grade II*
- Official name: Shalford Mill
- Designated: 14 Jun 1967
- Reference no.: 1294360

Shalford Mill is an 18th-century Grade II* listed watermill located on the River Tillingbourne in Shalford, near Guildford, Surrey, England. In 1932, the mill was endowed to the National Trust by a group of eccentric young female philanthropists calling themselves Ferguson's Gang.

== History ==
The Domesday Book records a mill being present on the site in 1086 - one of the five mills recorded as part of the great manor of Bramley. In the 15th century, the mill was owned by John atte Lee, and in the 16th by Sir Edmund Walsingham; in 1599 it was sold to George Austen.

The present timber-framed building, built around 1750 by John Mildred of Guildford, was unusual in that it originally housed two separate mills, each with its own waterwheel and machinery. The mill was operated for most of the 18th century by the Mildred family, first by John, then by his sons, Thomas and John, and then by his grandson, Daniel. In 1794 it was sold to Robert Austen and remained in his family, later the Godwin-Austens, for the rest of its working life. The eastern half of the mill ceased operation about 1870 and the machinery was removed. The western half remained in operation until 1914. Subsequently, the mill was used as a seed store and later as a furniture store. By 1927 it was unused.

=== Enter Ferguson's Gang ===
In danger of being demolished with its timbers sold off and the land marketed as building plots, Peggy Pollard, alias Bill Stickers, and Brynhild Catherine Jervis-Read, alias Sister Agatha, of Ferguson's Gang, persuaded the Godwin-Austen trust to donate the watermill to the National Trust on the understanding that the Gang would raise the money for its repair and future running costs. The repair was supervised by the conservation architect John Eric Miers Macgregor OBE who went on to become an important member of Ferguson's Gang and was given the pseudonym "The Artichoke". The titular head of the Godwin Austen Estate, Major Arthur Godwin-Austen was admitted to the Gang and given the pseudonym of "The Pious Yudhishthira". From 1932 until 1966, Ferguson's Gang had its headquarters at Shalford Mill.

The gang's headquarters include, amongst other 1930s memorabilia, two bunks salvaged from the R100 airship.

The National Trust converted the eastern half to residential accommodation. The western half with its machinery was preserved and restored though not to working order.

== The Mill ==
The mill was constructed to a very high standard, presumably as a demonstration of John Mildred's status. The timber-framed building has a clay tile roof and the walls are tile-hung to the level of the brick base. Diamond pattern leaded lights echo the tiling. Uniquely in Surrey, it has a lucam or projection of the upper story over the roadway to allow wagons to be loaded and unloaded easily.

=== Machinery ===
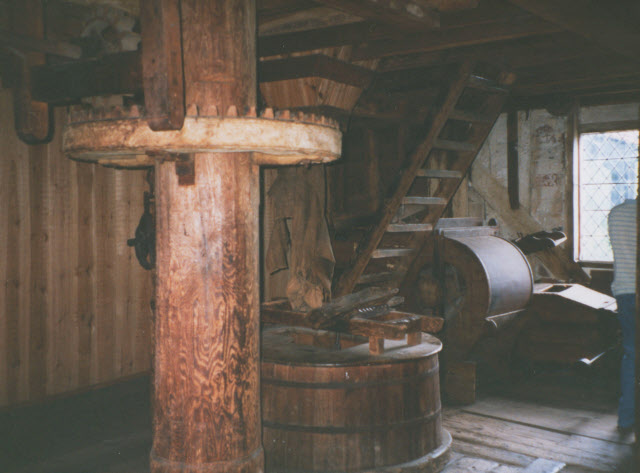
Interior of Shalford Mill

Originally each half of the mill had two pairs of millstones, the eastern sets were used to produce high quality flour for the domestic market. The western sets consisted of a coarse pair for grinding animal feed and a fine pair for grinding corn. Each pair was driven by a 14 ft (4.3 m) diameter breastshot water wheel. After the eastern side was closed a third pair of stones was added to the western half.

=== Millers ===
Though the Mildreds were the original proprietors, they probably employed a miller to do the actual work. After the sale in 1794 the following millers are known:

- John Sparkes, until 1830
- John Lambert
- Charles, Abraham and Daniel Lambert, sons of John
- George Lambert, John's grandson, until 1882
- Thomas and Frederick Botting
- Henry Botting, until 1917.

== Public access ==
The mill is currently closed to the public.
