= National Trust =

Conservation organisation in England, Wales and Northern Ireland

- The National Trust for Places of Historic Interest or Natural Beauty
- Ymddiriedolaeth Genedlaethol (Welsh)
- Established: 1895; 131 years ago (company limited by guarantee); 1907; 119 years ago (reincorporated as statutory corporation)
- Legal status: Statutory corporation
- Purpose: To look after Places of Historic Interest or Natural Beauty permanently for the benefit of the nation across England, Wales and Northern Ireland
- Headquarters: Heelis, Swindon, Wiltshire, England
- Region served: England, Wales and Northern Ireland
- Members: 5.38 million (2023/24)
- Key people: King Charles III (patron); René Olivieri (chairman); Hilary McGrady (director general)
- Main organ: Board of trustees
- Revenue: £723.8 million (2023/24)
- Staff: 14,000
- Volunteers: 53,000
- Website: nationaltrust.org.uk

The National Trust (Welsh: Ymddiriedolaeth Genedlaethol) is a heritage and nature conservation charity and membership organisation in the United Kingdom, operating in England, Wales and Northern Ireland only.

The Trust was founded in 1895 by Octavia Hill, Sir Robert Hunter and Hardwicke Rawnsley to "promote the permanent preservation for the benefit of the Nation of lands and tenements (including buildings) of beauty or historic interest". It has since been given statutory powers, starting with the National Trust Act 1907. In its early days, the Trust usually acquired land by gift and sometimes by public subscription and appeal. After World War II, the loss of country houses resulted in many such properties being acquired either by gift from the former owners or through the National Land Fund.

One of the largest landowners in the United Kingdom, the Trust owns almost 250,000 hectares (620,000 acres; 2,500 km^{2}; 970 sq mi) of land and 780 miles (1,260 km) of coast. Its properties include more than 500 historic houses, castles, archaeological and industrial monuments, gardens, parks, and nature reserves. Most properties are open to the public for a charge (members have free entry), while open spaces are free to all. The Trust had an annual income of nearly £724 million in 2023/24, largely from membership subscriptions, donations and legacies, direct property income, profits from its shops and restaurants, and investments. It also receives grants from a variety of organisations including other charities, government departments, local authorities, and the National Lottery Heritage Fund.

== History ==
=== Founders ===
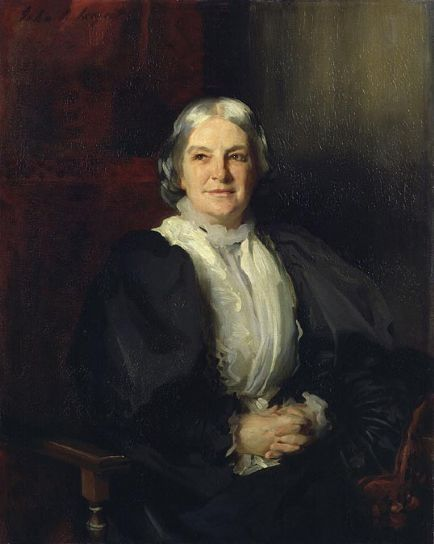
Octavia Hill by John Singer Sargent, 1898

The National Trust was incorporated on 12 January 1895 as the National Trust for Places of Historic Interest or Natural Beauty, which is still the organisation's legal name. The founders were social reformer Octavia Hill, solicitor Sir Robert Hunter and clergyman Hardwicke Rawnsley.

In 1876 Hill, together with her sister Miranda Hill, had set up a society to "diffuse a love of beautiful things among our poor brethren". Named after John Kyrle, the Kyrle Society campaigned for open spaces for the recreational use of urban dwellers, as well as having decorative, musical, and literary branches. Hunter had been solicitor to the Commons Preservation Society, while Rawnsley had campaigned for the protection of the Lake District. The idea of a company with the power to acquire and hold buildings and land had been mooted by Hunter in 1894.

In July 1894 a provisional council, headed by Hill, Hunter, Rawnsley and Hugh Grosvenor, 1st Duke of Westminster met at Grosvenor House and decided that the company should be named the National Trust for Places of Historic Interest or Natural Beauty. Articles of association were submitted to the Board of Trade and on the Trust was registered under the Companies Act on 12 January 1895. Its purpose was to "promote the permanent preservation for the benefit of the Nation of lands and tenements (including buildings) of beauty or historic interest".

=== Early years ===
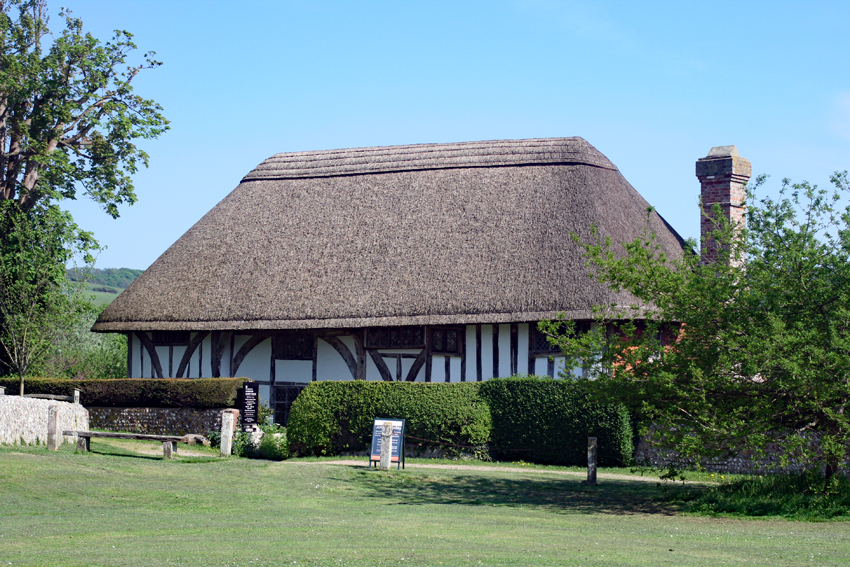
The first building the trust acquired was Alfriston Clergy House in 1896.

The National Trust acquired its first land in early 1895; Dinas Oleu, on the clifftop above Barmouth in Wales, was donated by Fanny Talbot, a friend of Rawnsley. The trust's first building was acquired the following year; Alfriston Clergy House, a 14th-century house in the Sussex village of Alfriston, was bought for £10 and required a further £350 for repairs.

In 1907 Hunter drafted the first National Trust Act, which was passed by Parliament and gave the trust the power to declare its land inalienable, meaning that it could not be sold without parliamentary approval. In addition, the act enabled the trust to make by-laws. Further acts followed in 1919, 1937, 1939, 1953, and 1971.

In the early days, the trust was concerned primarily with the acquisition (by gift or purchase) of open spaces and a variety of threatened buildings. The buildings were generally of modest size, an exception being Barrington Court in Somerset, the trust's first large country house. Two of the sites acquired by the trust in its early years later became nature reserves: Wicken Fen in Cambridgeshire and Blakeney Point in Norfolk, both purchased with the help of a donation by naturalist and banker Charles Rothschild. White Barrow on Salisbury Plain was the trust's first archaeological monument, purchased in 1909 for £60.

By 1914 the trust, operating out of a small office in London, had 725 members and had acquired 63 properties, covering 5,814 acres (2,353 ha).

=== Expansion ===
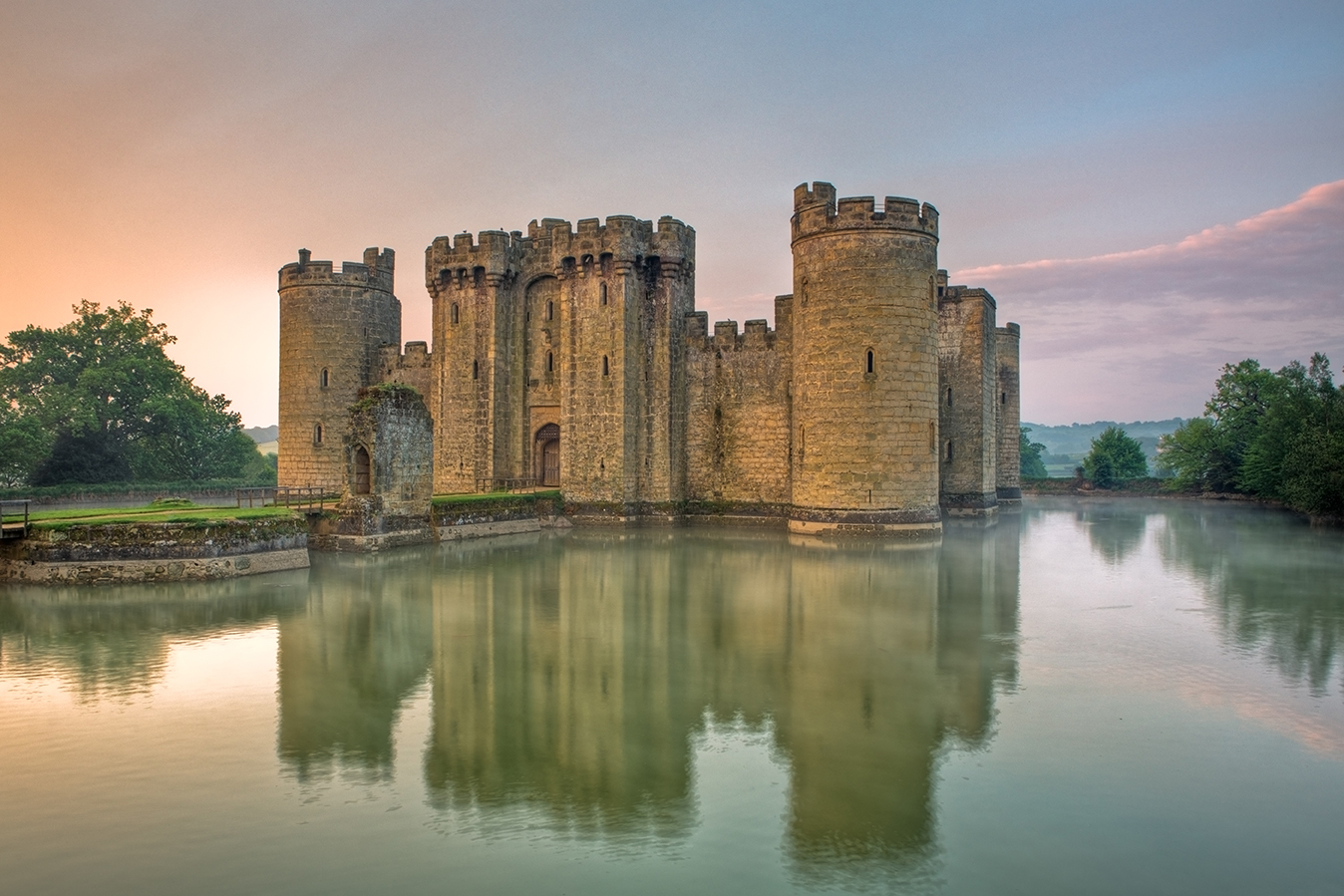
Bodiam Castle was acquired by the Trust in 1926.

In 1920 the National Trust lost the last of its three founders, Rawnsley. The Trust's 5,000 acres (2,000 ha) of land in the Lake District were augmented by gifts in his memory, including part of the Great Wood on Derwentwater. In 1923, literary critic John Bailey took over as chairman of the Trust. Under his chairmanship, the Trust saw an increase in funds, membership, and properties. The 1920s saw the acquisition of more archaeological sites, including Cissbury Ring in West Sussex, and early buildings, including two medieval castles (Bodiam Castle in East Sussex and Tattershall Castle, Lincolnshire) bequeathed to the Trust by Lord Curzon. In 1925 the Trust launched a national appeal to buy the Ashridge Estate in Hertfordshire, successfully raising a record £80,000. After Bailey's death in 1931, The Times credited him with helping to build the Trust's strong position and to encourage gifts of countryside and historic places to the nation.

The Trust, which already owned a large area of the Lake District, acquired its first piece of land in the Peak District in 1930. Four years later, Ilam Hall was presented to the Trust for use as a youth hostel. The 1930s saw an expansion of the Trust's interest in coastal conservation, with more than thirty small coastal properties in Devon and Cornwall alone given to the Trust. In 1934, the Trust acquired its first village, West Wycombe in Buckinghamshire, which was donated to the Trust by the Royal Society of Arts, which had bought it from Sir John Lindsay Dashwood five years previously. Quarry Bank Mill in Cheshire was donated to the Trust in 1939 with an estate including the village of Styal, which had been built for the mill workers by Samuel Greg.

During the 1930s and 1940s, the Trust benefited from the unconventional fundraising tactics of Ferguson's Gang; a group of women with pseudonyms such as Bill Stickers and Red Biddy who wore disguises and carried out stunts when delivering money to the Trust. Their donations enabled the Trust to purchase various properties including Shalford Mill, in Surrey, and Newtown Old Town Hall, on the Isle of Wight.

=== The country house scheme ===
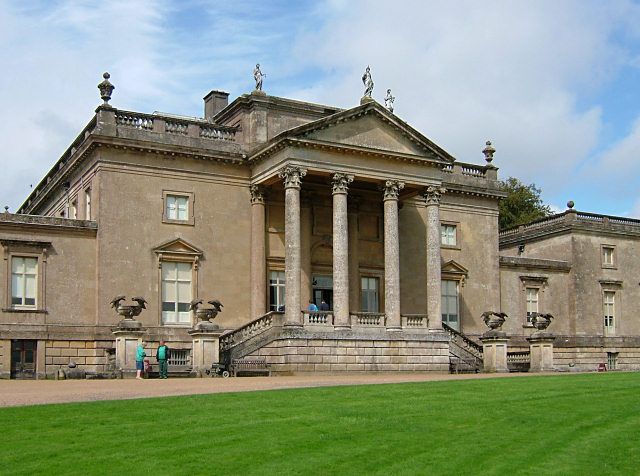
Stourhead

Bailey was followed as chairman of the National Trust by Lawrence Dundas, 2nd Marquess of Zetland, and in 1936 the Trust set up the Country Houses Committee, with James Lees-Milne as secretary, to look into ways of preserving country houses and gardens at a time when their owners could no longer afford to maintain them. A country house scheme was set up and the National Trust Acts of 1937 and 1939 facilitated the transfer of estates from private owners to the Trust. The scheme allowed owners to escape estate duty on their country house and on the endowment which was necessary for the upkeep of the house, while they and their heirs could continue to live in the property, providing the public were allowed some access. The first house offered under the scheme was Stourhead in Wiltshire, although it was not acquired by the Trust until after the death in 1947 of the owners Sir Henry and Lady Hoare.

The first property to be actually handed over to the Trust under the scheme was a relatively modern house: Wightwick Manor near Wolverhampton had been built just fifty years earlier. Lacock Abbey, also in Wiltshire, was another early acquisition, handed to the Trust by Matilda Talbot (granddaughter of Henry Fox Talbot) after nearly seven years of negotiations. The house came with the village of Lacock and an endowment of 300 acres (120 ha).

=== The postwar years ===
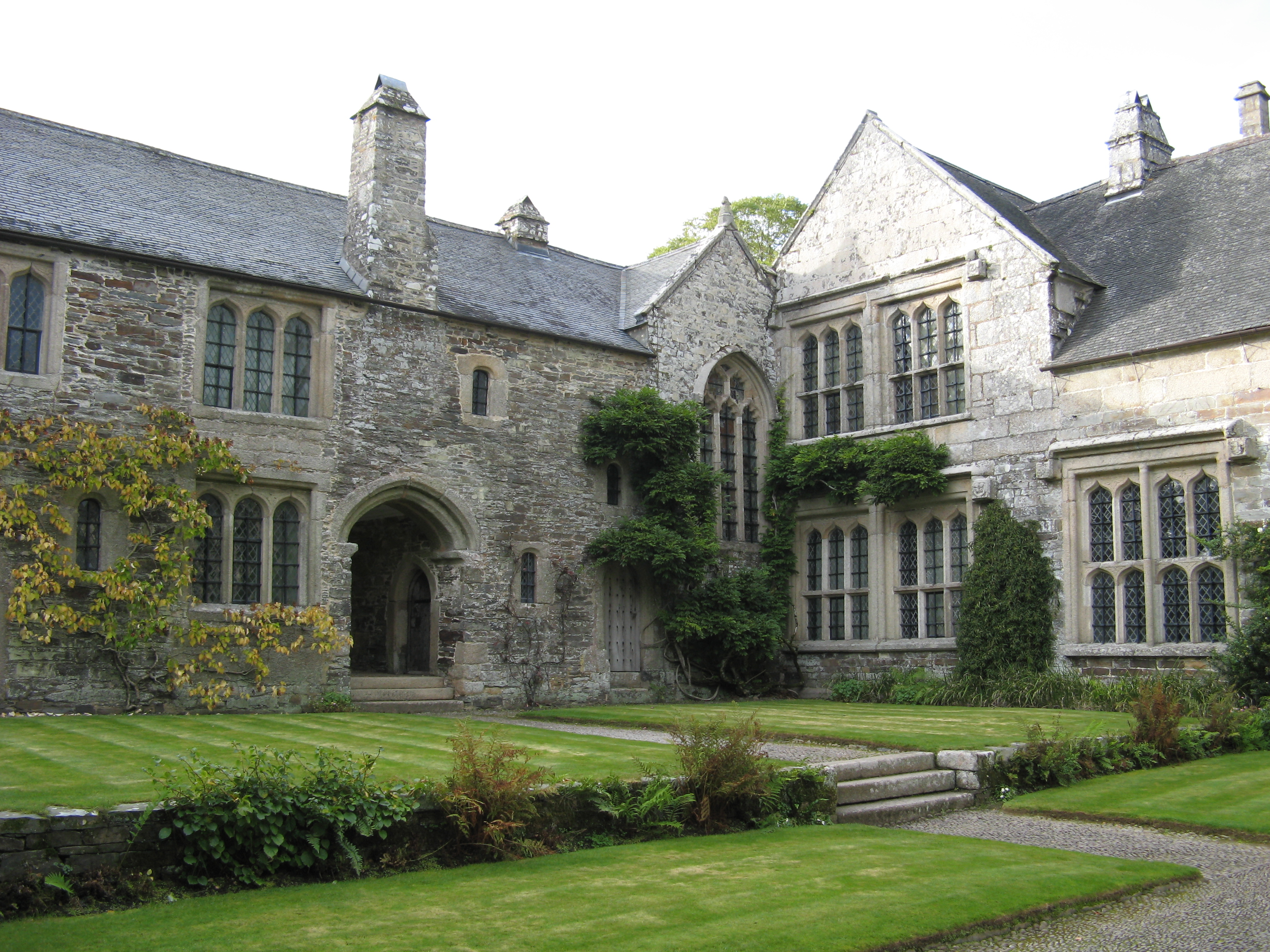
Cotehele

After World War II, the National Land Fund was set up by the government as a "thank-offering for victory" with the purpose of using money from the sale of surplus war stores to acquire property in the national interest. The scheme also allowed for the transfer to the National Trust of historic houses and land left to the government in payment of estate duty. The first open space acquired by the Trust under the Land Fund was farmland at Hartsop in the Lake District; the first country house was Cotehele in Cornwall. Later acquisitions included Hardwick Hall, Ickworth House, Penrhyn Castle and Sissinghurst Castle Garden. The Land Fund was replaced in 1980 by the National Heritage Memorial Fund.

The work of the Trust was aided by further legislation during this period: the Town and Country Planning Act 1947 led to greater cooperation between local authorities and the Trust, while the Historic Buildings and Ancient Monuments Act 1953 allowed the Trust to receive government grants for the upkeep and maintenance of historic buildings on the same terms as other owners.

A major project, begun in 1959 and completed in 1964, was the restoration of the southern section of the Stratford-upon-Avon Canal. The Trust was persuaded to take on the scheme by John Smith and the work was carried out by hundreds of volunteers.

In May 1945 the Trust's London headquarters moved to premises in Queen Anne's Gate. Between 1945 and 1965 the Trust, under the chairmanship of David Lindsay, 28th Earl of Crawford, saw a growth in its membership from 7,850 to 157,581 and growth in its staff from 15 to 450. The area of land owned by the Trust increased from 112,000 acres (45,000 ha) in 1945 to 328,000 acres (133,000 ha; 1,330 km^{2}; 512 sq mi) in 1965, with a further 53,000 acres (21,000 ha) covenanted.

=== The Benson Report ===
In 1965 the National Trust launched Enterprise Neptune, a campaign to acquire and protect stretches of coastline. It raised more than £800,000 in its first year, but also exposed arguments about the Trust's character, management and relationship with post-war mass leisure. The Neptune director, Conrad Rawnsley, a former naval commander and grandson of co-founder Hardwicke Rawnsley, wanted the campaign's energy and methods extended across the Trust's wider work. Rawnsley was dismissed in 1966 and then led a public reform campaign, arguing that the organisation was too closed, socially narrow and reluctant to provide ordinary visitors with access and facilities. The chairman, Lord Antrim, accepted that the Trust had become a "self-perpetuating oligarchy", while resisting Rawnsley's view that it should compete with the entertainment industry.

Rawnsley's supporters forced an extraordinary general meeting in February 1967. Their reform resolutions were defeated, but the dispute led the Trust's council to appoint an advisory committee on its constitution, organisation and responsibilities. The committee was chaired by the accountant Sir Henry Benson; its other members were Len Clark, Sir William Hayter and Patrick Gibson. The Benson report, dated December 1968, did not repudiate the Trust's conservation policy, but found that the organisation had outgrown its informal and largely amateur administration.

The report recommended a clearer professional chain of command under a director-general, devolution of day-to-day management to regional committees, stronger council oversight of the executive committee, wider voting rights for members, tighter financial control and improved visitor facilities, including refreshments, lavatories and parking, where preservation allowed.

The National Trust Act 1971 gave statutory form to much of the reform. It restructured the council and executive committee, recognised new classes of membership, required proper accounts and annual audit, and widened the Trust's powers to provide public facilities and to charge for some recreational uses.

=== Post-Benson expansion ===
Patrick Gibson, Baron Gibson, who chaired the Trust from 1977 to 1986, had served on the Benson committee and on the Trust's executive committee before becoming chairman.

In 1977 the sale of Mentmore Towers and its contents became a major heritage controversy. The government declined to acquire the house and contents in lieu of death duties, and the contents were sold at auction in May 1977. SAVE Britain's Heritage, founded two years earlier by Marcus Binney and others, led the public criticism. The National Heritage Memorial Fund later identified the loss of Mentmore as a trigger for the National Heritage Act 1980, which replaced the National Land Fund with the National Heritage Memorial Fund.

Membership rose from 160,000 in 1968 to 500,000 in 1975, over one million in 1981 and over two million by the time of the Trust's centenary in 1995. Full-time staff increased from 933 in 1968 to 1,488 in 1981, allowing the Trust to employ specialist advisers in conservation, architecture, archaeology and visitor services. The Trust also developed a director of public relations, regional information officers, clearer member communications, tea rooms, shops and event programmes at its properties. In 1984 it set up a separate trading company to run its commercial activities.

Gibson retired as chairman in 1986. His successor, Dame Jennifer Jenkins, was the Trust's first female chairman; she had served on the Historic Buildings Council for England and later co-authored the Trust's centenary history with Patrick James. When the Trust reached its centenary in 1995 it owned or looked after 223 houses, 159 gardens, 670,000 acres (270,000 ha; 2,700 km^{2}; 1,050 sq mi) of open countryside, and 530 miles (850 km) of coastline.

In the 1990s there was a dispute within the Trust over stag hunting, which was the subject of debate at annual general meetings. The Trust banned stag hunting on its land in 1997.

=== Twenty-first century ===
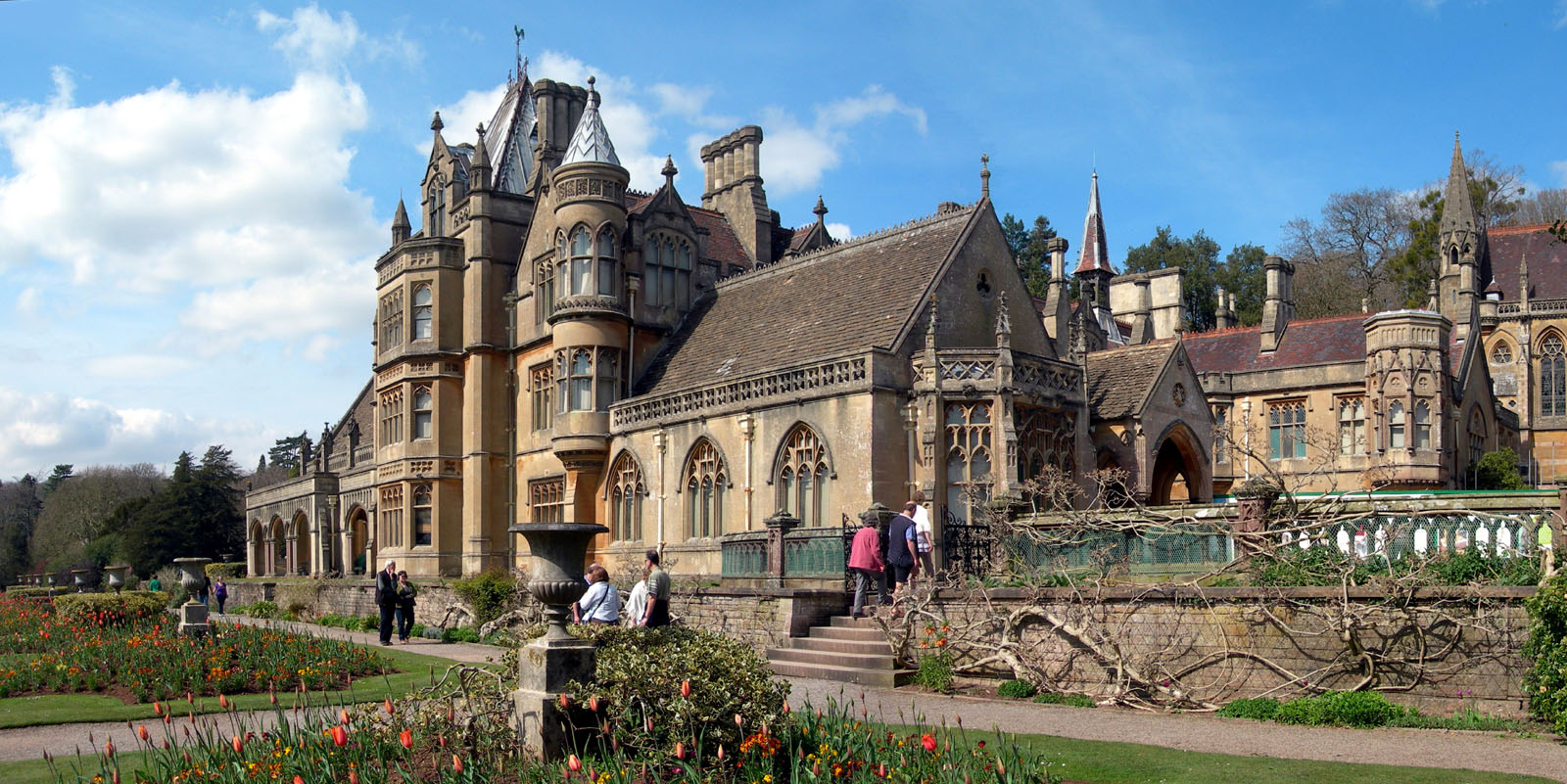
In 2002 the Trust acquired Tyntesfield, a Victorian Gothic mansion.

In 2002 the National Trust bought its first country house in more than a decade. Tyntesfield, a Victorian Gothic mansion in Somerset, was acquired with donations from the National Heritage Memorial Fund and the Heritage Lottery Fund as well as members of the public. Three years later, in 2005, the Trust acquired another country house, Seaton Delaval Hall in Northumberland.

In 2005 the Trust moved to Heelis, a new head office in Swindon, Wiltshire. The building was constructed on the site of the former Great Western Railway factory and is intended as a model of brownfield renewal. The name Heelis is taken from the married name of children's author Beatrix Potter, a supporter of, and donor to, the Trust, which now owns the land she formerly owned in Cumbria. A refit of the premises to accommodate increasing staff numbers was announced in June 2019.

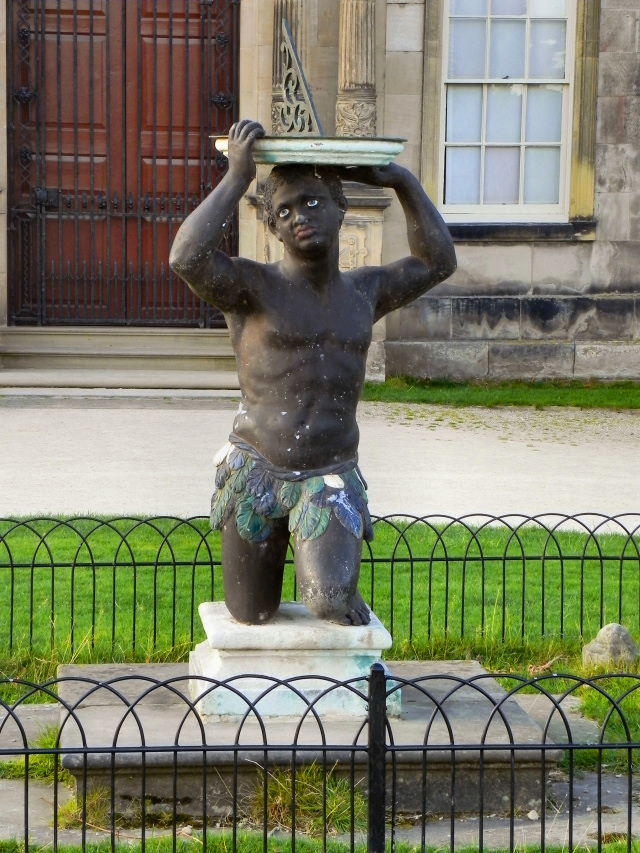
The Dunham Massey sundial

In 2007 the bicentenary of the official abolition of the slave trade, the Trust published the article "Addressing the Past" in its quarterly magazine, examining aspects of the Trust's "hidden history" and finding ways of "reinterpreting some of its properties and collections". Research carried out by the Trust revealed in 2020 that 93, nearly one third, of their houses and gardens had connections with colonialism and historic slavery: "this includes the global slave trades, goods and products of enslaved labour, abolition and protest, and the East India Company". The report attracted controversy and the Charity Commission opened a regulatory compliance case into the Trust in September 2020 to examine the trustees' decision-making. The Charity Commission concluded that there were no grounds for regulatory action against the Trust. In 2020, the Dunham Massey Hall sundial statue of "a kneeling African figure clad in leaves carrying the sundial above his head" was removed from its position in front of Dunham Massey Hall after calls were made for the removal of statues in Britain with links to the slave trade in the wake of the murder of George Floyd.

Between 2008 and 2013, the National Trust in Devon was defrauded of over £1 million by one of its employees. Building surveyor Roger Bryant was convicted in September 2024 of having submitted false invoices to the Trust and was sentenced to six-and-a-half years in prison. The fraud had only come to light when the Trust decided to update its procurement procedures in 2013.

The COVID-19 pandemic led to the closure in March 2020 of National Trust houses, shops, and cafes, closely followed by all gated parks and gardens. At the same time, the Trust launched the #BlossomWatch campaign which encouraged people to share images on social media of blossoms seen on lockdown walks. Parks and gardens started to re-open from June 2020.

In 2021 a group of members started a campaign, Restore Trust, to debate concerns about the future of the charity. At the Trust's 2023 annual general meeting, the Restore Trust Group put up three candidates for the council and two resolutions, but all were rejected by the membership.

== Governance ==
National Trust Act 1907 (Note: Section 1.)
- Act of Parliament
- Parliament of the United Kingdom
- Long title: An Act to incorporate and confer powers upon the National Trust for Places of Historic Interest or Natural Beauty.
- Citation: 7 Edw. 7. c. cxxxvi
- Territorial extent: United Kingdom

Dates
- Royal assent: 21 August 1907
- Commencement: 21 August 1907 (Note: The Acts of Parliament (Commencement) Act 1793.)
Other legislation
Amended by	National Trust Act 1953; National Trust Act 1971; Statute Law (Repeals) Act 2004

Status: Amended

Text of statute as originally enacted

National Trust Charity Scheme Confirmation Act 1919
- Act of Parliament
- Parliament of the United Kingdom
- Long title: An Act to confirm a Scheme of the Charity Commissioners for the application or management of the Charity called the National Trust for Places of Historic Interest or Natural Beauty incorporated by the National Trust Act 1907 (7 Edw. VII. cap. cxxxvi. Local and Private).
- Citation: 9 & 10 Geo. 5. c. lxxxiv
- Territorial extent: United Kingdom

Dates
- Royal assent: 15 August 1919
- Commencement: 15 August 1919
Other legislation
Amended by	Statute Law (Repeals) Act 2004

Status: Amended

National Trust Act 1937 (Note: Section 1(1).)
- Act of Parliament
- Parliament of the United Kingdom
- Long title: An Act to confer further powers upon the National Trust for Places of Historic Interest or Natural Beauty and for other purposes.
- Citation: 1 Edw. 8 & 1 Geo. 6. c. lvii
- Territorial extent: United Kingdom

Dates
- Royal assent: 1 July 1937
- Commencement: 1 July 1937
Other legislation
Amended by	National Trust Act 1953; National Trust Act 1971; Statute Law (Repeals) Act 2004

Status: Amended

Text of statute as originally enacted

National Trust Act 1939
- Act of Parliament
- Parliament of the United Kingdom
- Long title: An Act to make further provision with respect to the transfer of lands to the National Trust for Places of Historic Interest or Natural Beauty and for other purposes.
- Citation: 2 & 3 Geo. 6. c. lxxxvi
- Territorial extent: United Kingdom

Dates
- Royal assent: 28 July 1939
- Commencement: 28 July 1939
Other legislation
Amended by	Statute Law (Repeals) Act 2004

Status: Amended

National Trust Act 1953
- Act of Parliament
- Parliament of the United Kingdom
- Long title: An Act to amend the National Trust Acts 1907 to 1939 to confer further powers upon the National Trust for Places of Historic Interest or Natural Beauty and upon the council thereof and for other purposes.
- Citation: 1 & 2 Eliz. 2. c. vii
- Territorial extent: United Kingdom

Dates
- Royal assent: 6 May 1953
- Commencement: 6 May 1953
Other legislation
Amends	National Trust Act 1907; National Trust Act 1937
Amended by	Statute Law (Repeals) Act 2004; Charities (National Trust) Order 2005

Status: Amended

Text of statute as originally enacted

National Trust Act 1971
- Act of Parliament
- Parliament of the United Kingdom
- Long title: An Act to amend the constitution of the National Trust for Places of Historic Interest or Natural Beauty; to amend the National Trust Acts 1907 to 1953; to confer further powers on the said National Trust; and for other purposes.
- Citation: 1971 c. vi
- Territorial extent: England and Wales; Scotland; (Note: Section 33.)

Dates
- Royal assent: 17 February 1971
- Commencement: 17 February 1971
Other legislation
Amends	National Trust Act 1907; National Trust Act 1937
Amended by	Statute Law (Repeals) Act 2004; Charities (National Trust) Order 2005

Status: Amended

Text of statute as originally enacted

Charities (National Trust) Order 2005
- Statutory Instrument
- Parliament of the United Kingdom
- Citation: SI 2005/712
- Territorial extent: United Kingdom

Dates
- Made: 11 March 2005
- Commencement: 25 March 2005
Other legislation
Amends	National Trust Act 1953; National Trust Act 1971
Made under	Charities Act 1993

Status: Current legislation

Text of statute as originally enacted

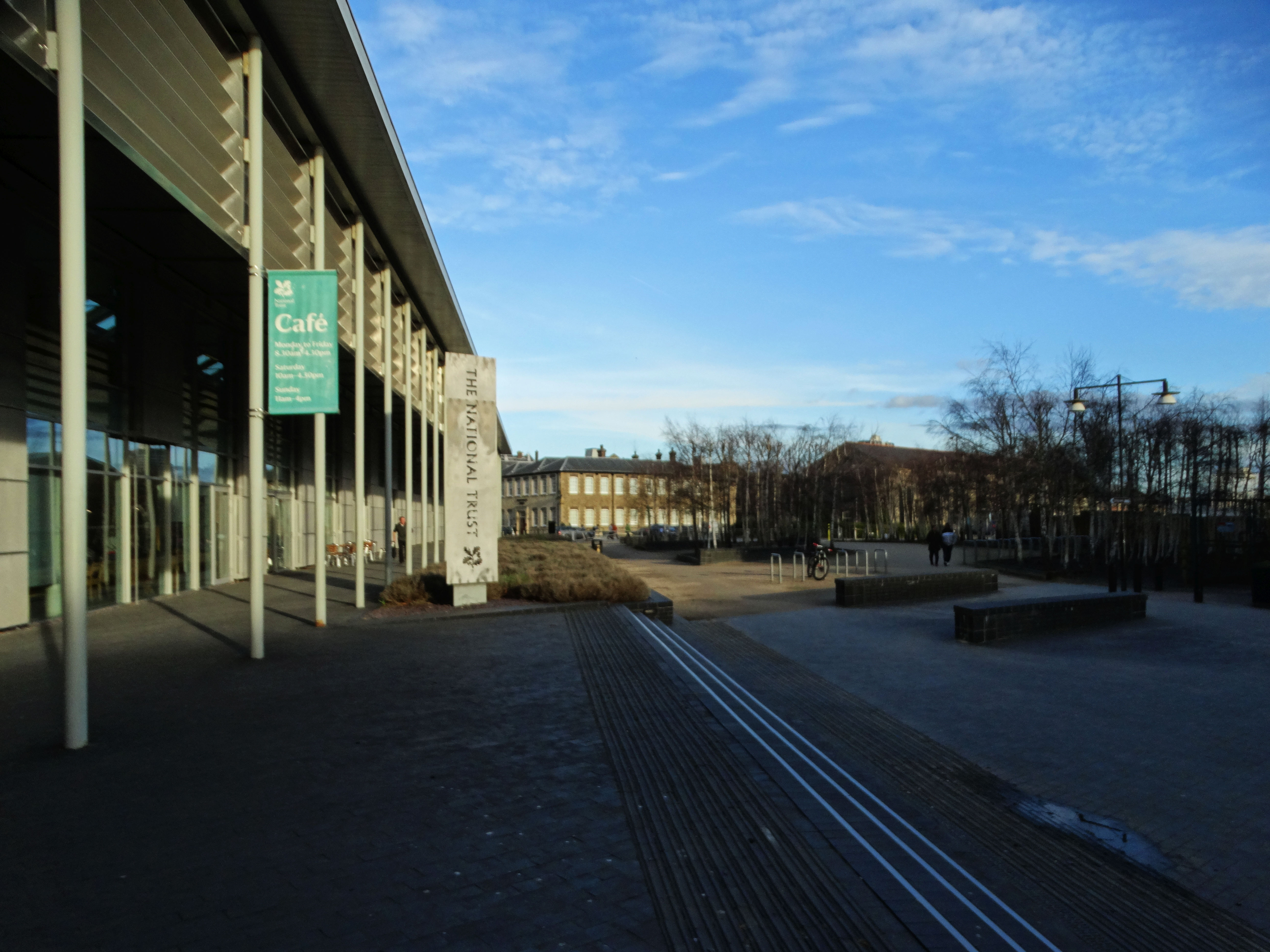
Heelis

The National Trust is an independent charity (no. 205846). It was founded as a not-for-profit company in 1895, but was later re-incorporated by a local act of Parliament, the National Trust Act 1907 (7 Edw. 7. c. cxxxvi). Subsequent acts of Parliament between 1919 and 1971 amended and extended the Trust's powers and remit. The governance of the Trust was amended by the Charities (National Trust) Order 2005 (SI 2005/712).

The Trust is governed by a board of trustees (of between nine and fifteen members), appointed and overseen by a council consisting of eighteen people elected by the members of the Trust and eighteen appointed by other organisations whose work is related to that of the Trust, such as the Soil Association, the Royal Horticultural Society and the Council for British Archaeology. The members periodically vote on the organisations which may appoint half of the council. Members may also propose and vote on motions at the annual general meeting.

At an operational level, the Trust is organised into regions which are aligned with the official local government regions of the UK. Its headquarters are in Swindon.

In 2019/20 the Trust was employing 14,000 staff, including about 4,000 seasonal workers. Since 2009, customer services have been outsourced to Capita. The director-general of the Trust, Hilary McGrady, was paid an annual salary of £200,000 in 2023/24, with a further nineteen executives being paid over £100,000 a year. The Trust is not a Real Living Wage employer. In October 2020 the Trust announced 1,300 job losses due to the coronavirus pandemic. In July 2025, the Trust said that financial pressures such as increases in National Insurance and the National Living Wage meant it would look to cut its workforce by 6%.

== Funding ==
As of 2023/24, the National Trust's annual income was approximately £724 million. The largest source of income is membership subscriptions, followed by direct property income and charitable trading. The Trust also receives grants from the Department for Environment, Food and Rural Affairs and other government departments, the National Lottery Heritage Fund, local authorities, and charities. In recognition of National Lottery funding, the Trust invites lottery ticket holders to visit over 100 properties free of charge for a few days annually. The Trust also takes part in the annual Heritage Open Days programme, when non-members can visit selected properties free of charge.

== Membership and volunteering ==
In the year ending February 2024, the National Trust had 5.38 million members (2.62 million memberships). Members are entitled to free entry to Trust properties that are open to the public for a charge. There is a separate organisation called the Royal Oak Foundation for American supporters.

The Trust is supported by volunteers, who, as of 2024, numbered around 40,000.

== National Trust properties ==
As of 2020, the National Trust owns almost 250,000 hectares (620,000 acres; 2,500 km^{2}; 970 sq mi) of land, 780 miles (1,260 km) of coast, more than 200 historic houses, 41 castles and chapels, 47 industrial monuments and mills, the sites of factories and mines, 9 lighthouses, 56 villages, 39 public houses, and 25 medieval barns. Most of the land is farmed, either in-hand or by tenant farmers. The Trust also rents out holiday cottages, which are given a rating of 1–5 Acorns to reflect the quality of the property.

=== Historic houses and gardens ===
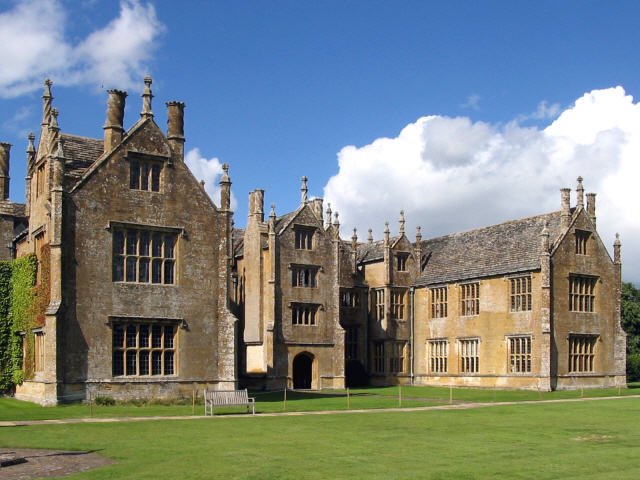
Barrington Court

The National Trust owns more than 200 historic houses that are open to the public. Most of them are large country houses or stately homes set in gardens and parks. They contain collections of pictures, furniture, books, metalwork, ceramics, and textiles that have remained in their historic context. Service wings are preserved at many houses. Attingham Park in Shropshire, the most visited National Trust country house in 2019/20, is set in typical grounds with a walled garden and extensive parkland planted with trees to the designs of Humphry Repton. The most visited National Trust property in England in 2019/20 for which an admission charge is made was Clumber Park in Nottinghamshire, a park without a country house. Clumber House was largely demolished in 1938, leaving a 19th-century chapel as the focus of the park, which also contains a lake with wooded islands, a stable block, glasshouses, and two classical temples.

The first country house to be acquired by the Trust, the Elizabethan manor house Barrington Court in Somerset, was bought in 1907 and came in a dilapidated state and devoid of contents. The experience taught the Trust a salutary lesson about the need for endowments to cover the costs of the upkeep of country houses. The Trust acquired the majority of its country houses in the mid 20th century, when death duties were at their highest and many country houses were being demolished. The arrangements made with families bequeathing their homes to the Trust often allowed them to continue to live in the property. Since the 1980s the Trust has been increasingly reluctant to take over large houses without substantial accompanying endowment funds, and its acquisitions in this category have been less frequent, with only two, Tyntesfield and Seaton Delaval Hall, since 2000.

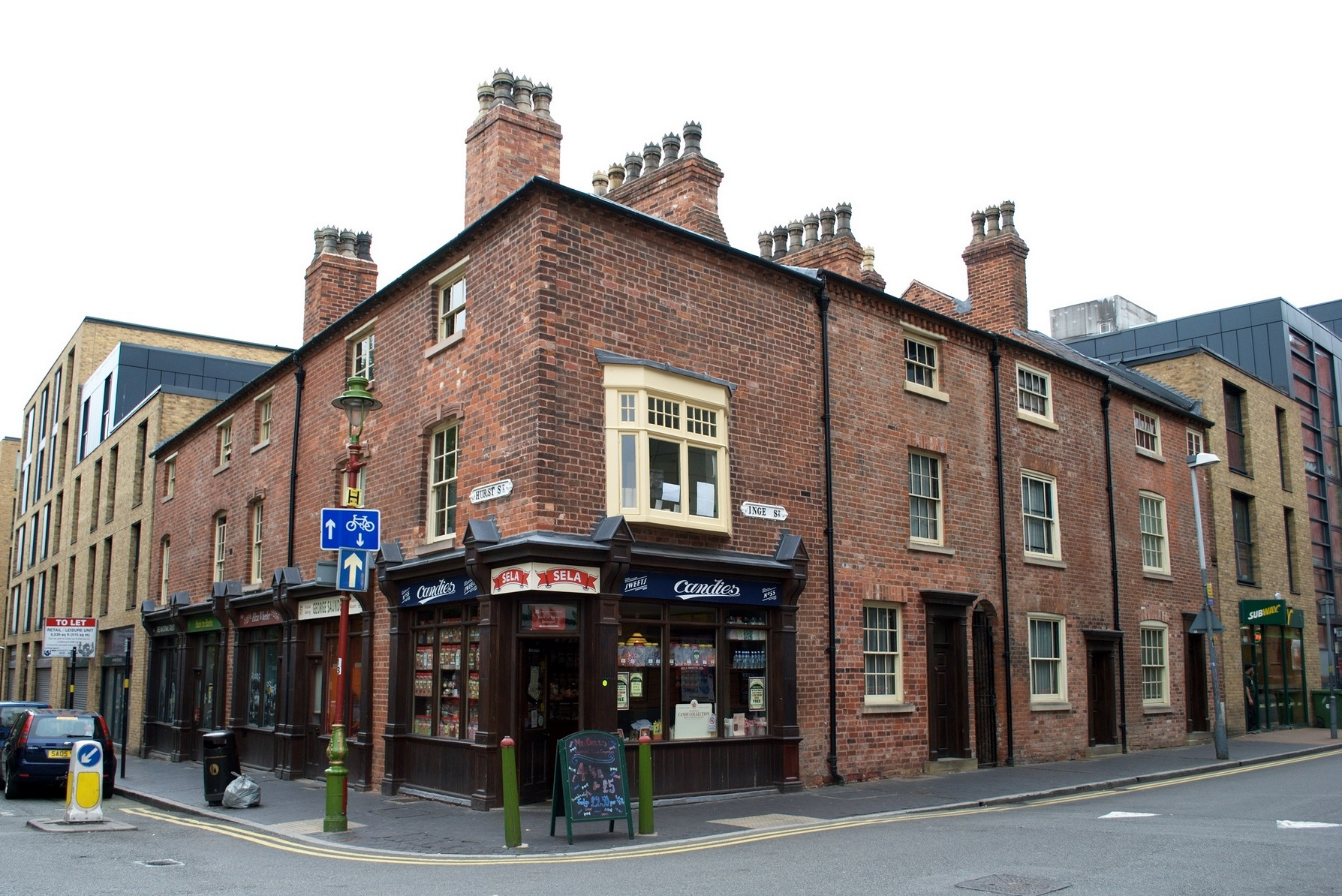
Birmingham Back to Backs exterior

As well as great country houses, the Trust also owns smaller properties, many of them associated with famous people. Examples include: Cherryburn, the cottage in Northumberland where Thomas Bewick was born; Smallhythe Place in Kent, home to Ellen Terry; Shaw's Corner in Hertfordshire, the country home of George Bernard Shaw. The home of architect Ernő Goldfinger, 2 Willow Road in Hampstead, London, was the first example of Modernist architecture to be acquired by the Trust. In 1995 the Trust bought 20 Forthlin Road in Liverpool, the childhood home of Paul McCartney; 251 Menlove Avenue, the childhood home of John Lennon, was bought by Yoko Ono in 2002 and donated to the Trust. The Birmingham Back to Backs are an example of working-class housing preserved by the Trust.

Some properties have individual arrangements with the Trust, so for example Wakehurst is managed by the Royal Botanic Gardens, Kew and Waddesdon Manor by the Rothschild Foundation; both are open to the public. In January 2025, it was announced that the Trust had entered into an agreement with Historic Coventry Trust to run The Charterhouse, Coventry.

=== Art collection ===
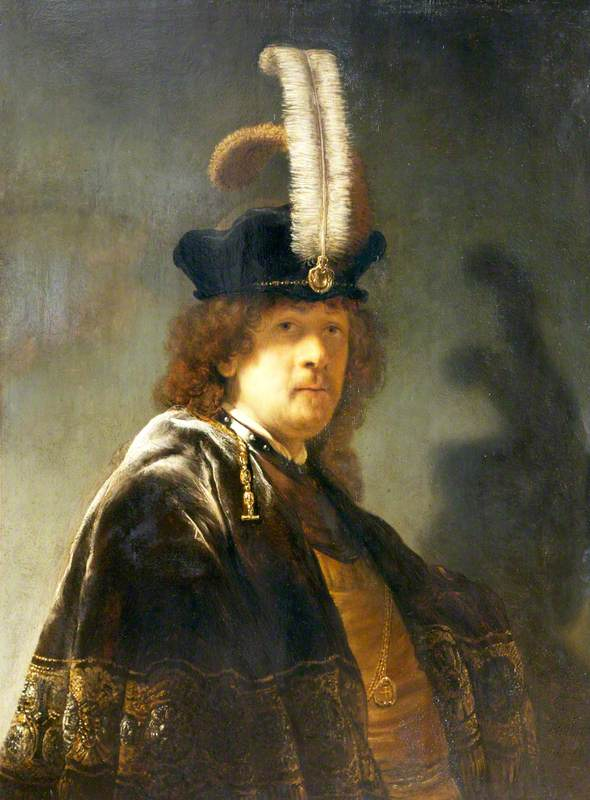
Rembrandt self-portrait at Buckland Abbey

Since its founding in 1895, the National Trust has gradually expanded its collection of art. Beatrix Potter bequeathed some of her book illustrations to the Trust, but the expansion has mostly been through whole property acquisitions. Artists represented in the Trust's collections include Rembrandt (whose Self-portrait wearing a white feathered bonnet which is now displayed at Buckland Abbey was recently re-attributed to the artist), Hieronymous Bosch, El Greco, Peter Paul Rubens, Angelica Kauffmann, and Stanley Spencer.

From 1956 until the post was removed in 2021, there was a curator of pictures and sculpture. The first was St John (Bobby) Gore, who was appointed "Adviser on Paintings" in 1956. He published catalogues of the pictures at Upton House, Polesden Lacey, Buscot Park, Saltram House, and Ascott House. His successor in 1986 was Alastair Laing, who cared for the works of art at 120 properties and created the exhibition In Trust for the Nation, held at the National Gallery in 1995–96. From 2009 until 2021, the curator was David Taylor, who approved photographs of the Trust's 12,567 oil paintings to be included in the Public Catalogue Foundation's searchable online archive of oil paintings, available since 2012.

The Trust commissioned artists to create works depicting National Trust places with their "Foundation for Art" programme, which ran from the 1980s to 2001. A contemporary art programme entitled "Trust New Art", a joint venture with Arts Council England and Arts Council of Wales, was launched in 2009. As part of this programme, the Trust has worked with over 200 artists to create new artworks inspired by their places including: Jeremy Deller, Anya Gallaccio, Antony Gormley, Sir Richard Long, Serena Korda, Marcus Coates and Katie Paterson.

=== Coastline and countryside ===
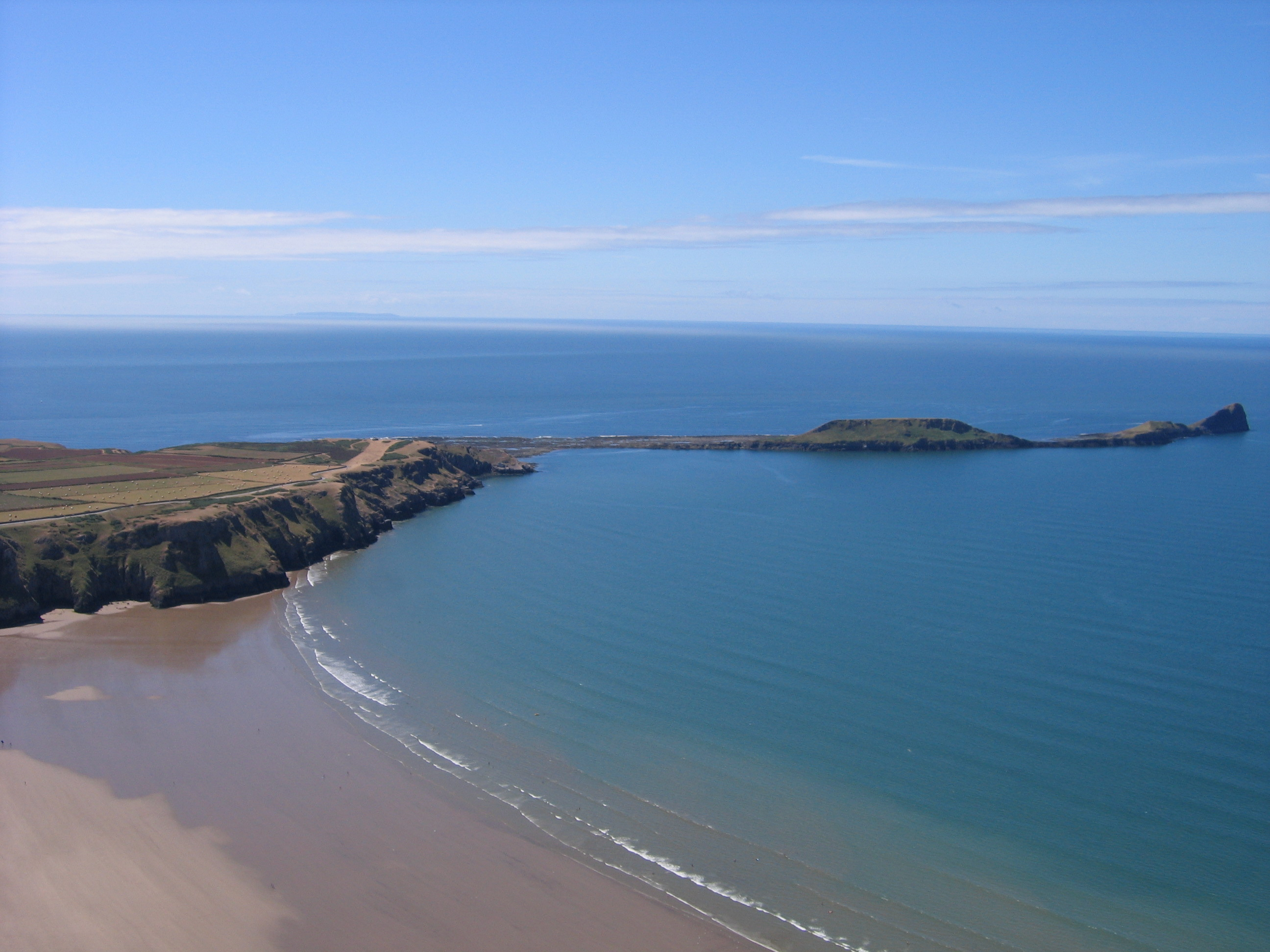
Cliffs and Worm's Head at Rhossili

The National Trust is the largest private landowner in the United Kingdom. The Trust's land holdings account for almost 250,000 hectares (620,000 acres; 2,500 km^{2}; 970 sq mi), mostly of countryside. A large part of this consists of parks and agricultural estates attached to country houses, but there are many countryside properties which were acquired specifically for their scenic or scientific value. The Trust owns or has covenant over about a quarter of the Lake District; it has similar control over about 12% of the Peak District National Park (e.g. South Peak Estate and High Peak Estate).

Most National Trust land, about 200,000 hectares (490,000 acres; 2,000 km^{2}; 770 sq mi), consists of tenant or in-hand farms, where public access is restricted to rights of way and sometimes additional routes. At Wimpole Estate in Cambridgeshire, the home farm is open to the public. The Trust also owns forests, woods, downs, and moorland. These areas are generally open to the public free of charge, as are some of the parks attached to country houses (others have an admission charge).

The Trust owns or protects roughly one-fifth of the coastline in England, Wales, and Northern Ireland (780 miles (1,260 km)), and has a long-term campaign, Project Neptune, which seeks to acquire more.

=== Protection of National Trust property ===
Section 21 of the National Trust Act 1907 granted the National Trust the unique statutory power to declare land inalienable. This prevents the land from being voluntarily sold or mortgaged by the Trust. Inalienable land can be leased to tenants.

Section 5 of the Acquisition of Land Act 1981 protects inalienable land from compulsory purchase against the objections of the National Trust. Where the Trust objects to a compulsory purchase order, the order is subject to the "special parliamentary procedure" in the Statutory Orders (Special Procedure) Act 1945: the order must be laid before Parliament, and can be petitioned against. The House of Commons and the House of Lords can then independently each vote to annul the order. If neither house votes to annul, the compulsory purchase proceeds.

Similar restrictions apply to compulsory purchase orders granted under the Planning Act 2008, the Harbours Act 1964, the New Towns Act 1981 and the Transport and Works Act 1992.

The inalienability of Trust land was over-ridden by Parliament in the case of proposals to construct a section of the Plympton bypass through the park at Saltram, on the grounds that the road proposal had been known about before the park at Saltram was declared inalienable.

In 2017 the Trust, in spite of criticism by members, supported the government's scheme to build a road tunnel under the Stonehenge World Heritage Site as part of the plans to upgrade the A303 road. The scheme would involve the compulsory purchase of land held inalienably by the Trust.

=== Most visited properties ===
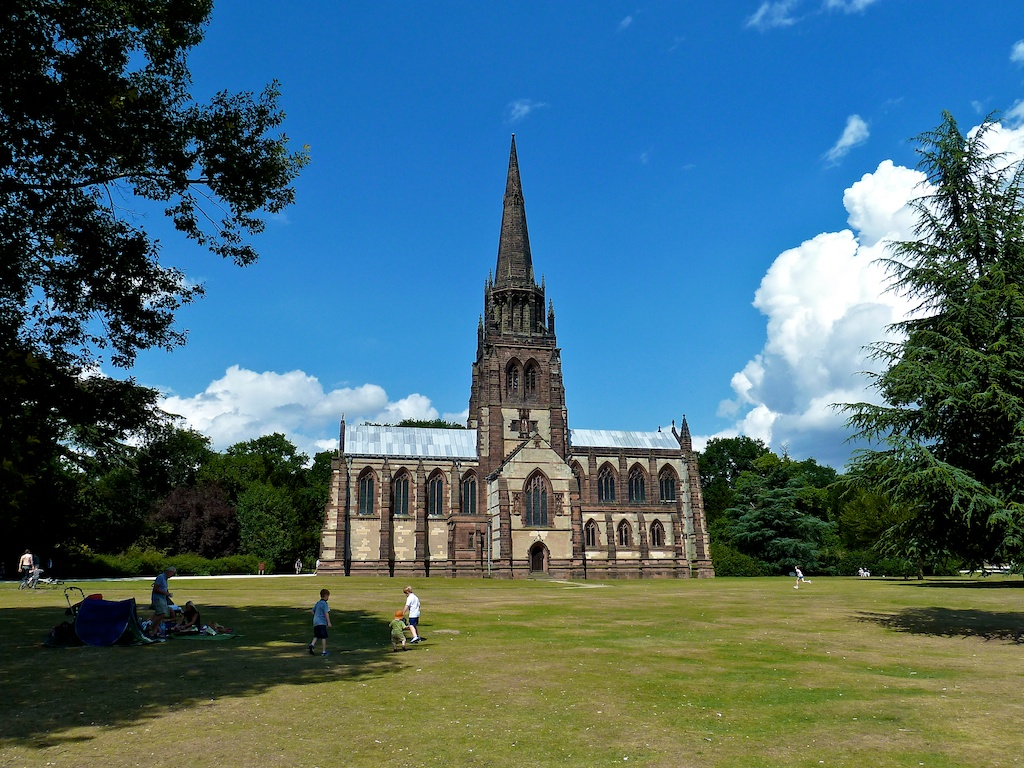
Clumber Park in Nottinghamshire, the Trust's most visited property in the 2024-2025 season

The National Trust's 2024-2025 Annual Report lists all properties open at charge with more than 50,000 visitors. The top twenty are:

No.	Property	Location	Visitors
1	Clumber Park	Nottinghamshire	▲716,956
2	Attingham Park	Shropshire	▼582,377
3	Dunham Massey Hall	Greater Manchester	▲534,354
4	Cliveden	Buckinghamshire	▲520,850
5	Calke Abbey	Derbyshire	▲496,694
6	Fountains Abbey	North Yorkshire	▼413,671
7	Giant's Causeway	Antrim	▲420,877
8	Nymans	West Sussex	▲413,512
9	Tyntesfield	Somerset	▼386,812
10	Kingston Lacy	Dorset	▼381,221
11	Polesden Lacey	Surrey	▼383,402
12	Anglesey Abbey	Cambridgeshire	▲396,927
13	Stourhead	Wiltshire	▲397,495
14	Wimpole Estate	Cambridgeshire	▲370,379
15	Mottisfont	Hampshire	▼341,428
16	Belton House	Lincolnshire	▲426,239
17	Lyme Park	Cheshire	▼336,960
18	Ickworth House	Suffolk	▼331,132
19	Sheffield Park	Sussex	▲320,427
20	Waddesdon	Buckinghamshire	▲312,000

== See also ==
- An Taisce and the Irish Heritage Trust (Republic of Ireland)
- English Heritage, a similar charity that manages places of historic interest in England
- Historic Houses Association
- Landmark Trust
- List of National Trust properties in England
- List of National Trust properties in Northern Ireland
- List of National Trust properties in Wales
- National Trust (typeface)
- National Trust for Scotland
- Manx National Heritage (equivalent body for the Isle of Man)
