= List of National Trust properties in Northern Ireland =

National Trust properties in Northern Ireland is a list of National Trust properties in Northern Ireland.

Name	Grade	County	Address	GPS Coordinates	Year constructed	Owner
Carrick-a-Rede Rope Bridge		County Antrim				
The Crown Liquor Saloon		County Antrim				
Divis and Black Mountain, Belfast		County Antrim				
Dunseverick Castle		County Antrim				
Fair Head Coastal Nature Reserve		County Antrim				
Giant's Causeway		County Antrim				
Patterson's Spade Mill		County Antrim				
Ardress House		County Armagh				
Coney Island, Lough Neagh		County Armagh				
Derrymore House		County Armagh				
The Argory		County Armagh				
Castle Ward	A	County Down				
Mount Stewart	A	County Down				
Murlough Nature Reserve		County Down				
Rowallane Garden		County Down				
Castle Coole	A	County Fermanagh				
Crom Estate		County Fermanagh				
Florence Court	A	County Fermanagh				
Downhill Estate and Mussenden Temple		County Londonderry				
Hezlett House		County Londonderry				
Springhill		County Londonderry				
Portstewart Strand		County Londonderry				
Gray's Printing Press, Strabane		County Tyrone				
Wellbrook Beetling Mill, Cookstown		County Tyrone				

== See also ==
- List of National Trust properties in England
- List of National Trust properties in Wales
- List of National Trust for Scotland properties
- An Taisce and the Irish Heritage Trust (Republic of Ireland - including list of properties)
