= List of National Trust properties in Wales =

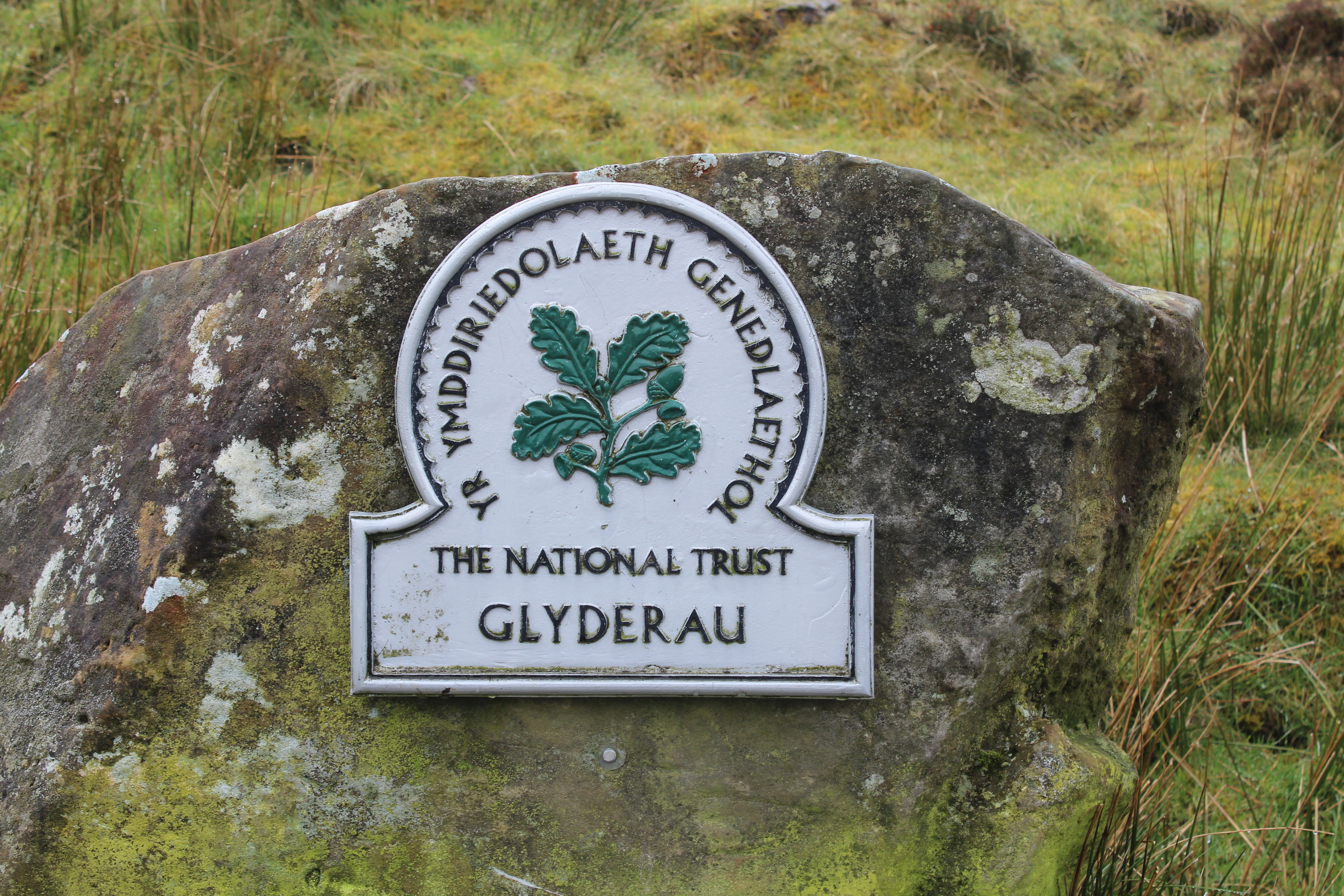
Sign in the Glyderau, with the name of the National Trust in English and Welsh

Below is a list of the stately homes, historic houses, castles, abbeys, museums, estates, coastline and open country in the care of the National Trust in Wales, grouped into the unitary authority areas. Many areas of land owned by the trust, both open-access and closed to the public, are not listed here. This is a list of the more notable sites, generally defined as those having either an entry in the National Trust handbook, or a page on their website. There are many other areas of moorland and open country, agricultural holdings and coastline belonging to the National Trust, that are not listed here.

== Anglesey ==
List of National Trust properties in Anglesey
Site Name	Property type	Year acquired	Location	Image	Description
Plas Newydd	House and Gardens	1976	Llanfairpwll; LL61 6DQ; 53.2026°N 4.21541°W	Plas Newydd, Anglesey	The 18th century House is situated on the bank of the Menai Strait, and was the seat of the Marquesses of Anglesey.
Cemlyn and North Anglesey Coast	Coastline	1971	Cemlyn; LL67 0DY; 53.412228°N 4.51752°W	Cemlyn Bay, Anglesey	The Trust has the care of extensive sections of coastline around Cemlyn Bay, Cemaes Bay and Carmel Head.
Swtan	Farmhouse	1999	Church Bay; LL65 4ET; 53.3710647°N 4.5548757°W	Restored cottage and museum - geograph.org.uk - 1410622	The last traditional thatched farmhouse on Anglesey, it was purchased and restored by the National Trust and the Cyfeillion Swtan (Friends of Swtan) in the late 1990s.

== Carmarthenshire ==
List of National Trust properties in Carmarthenshire
Site Name	Property type	Year acquired	Location	Image	Description
Aberdeunant	Farmhouse		Taliaris, Nr Llandeilo; 51.9594°N 3.9334°W		Tenanted traditional working farmhouse, no longer generally open to the public
Dinefwr Park and Newton House	House and Parkland	1990	Llandeilo; SA19 6RT; 51.882099°N 4.01424°W	Newton House from Dinefwr Castle keep	18th century parkland landscape and Edwardian mansion. (There is also a castle managed by Cadw)
Dolaucothi Gold Mines	Archaeological site	1941	Pumsaint; SA19 8US; 52.0443°N 3.94824°W	Dolaucothi Gold Mines	Archaeology from Roman mines and Underground tours of Victorian and 20th century mines.
Dolaucothi Estate woodland	Woodland trails	1944	Pumsaint; SA19 8US; 52.0443°N 3.94824°W	Dolaucothi summit	Multi-user trails through the woods and hills above the Gold Mines
Paxton's Tower	Folly	1965	Llanarthne, Dryslwyn; SA32 8HX; 51.850824°N 4.1218203°W	Paxton's Tower, Carmarthenshire	Known as 'Golwg y Byd' (Eye of the World), with views of seven counties, it is a folly built by Sir William Paxton (1745-1824)

== Ceredigion ==
List of National Trust properties in Ceredigion
Site Name	Property type	Year acquired	Location	Image	Description
Llanerchaeron	House and Estate	1986	Ciliau Aaron; SA46 6DG; 52.218201°N 4.22546°W	Llanerchaeron House	1790s John Nash villa surrounded by a self-contained farm estate and parkland.
Mwnt	Coastline	1963	Near Cardigan; SA43 1QF; 52.135648°N 4.6390951°W	Uncrowded beach at Mwnt	Beach, headland and medieval church
Penbryn	Coastline	1967	Sarnau; SA44 6QL; 52.1438°N 4.49629°W	Penbryn Beach from coastal path	A mile of golden sand accessed through a wooded valley.
Also in Ceredigion are numerous beaches, cliffs and coastal features such Ynys Lochtyn, Newquay - Cwm Tydu and Mynachdy'r Graig, and inland sites such as Henllan, Ceredigion and Bryn Bras SSSI.

== Conwy ==
List of National Trust properties in Conwy
Site Name	Property type	Year acquired	Location	Image	Description
Aberconwy House	Merchant's House	1934	Castle Street; LL32 8AY; 53.2821°N 3.82732°W	Aberconwy House, Conwy	15th century house in the centre of Conwy.
Bodnant Garden	Gardens	1949	Tal-y-Cafn, Nr Colwyn Bay; LL28 5RE; 53.2388°N 3.8689°W	The Laburnum Arch at Bodnant Garden	80 acres (32 ha) garden, first planted in 1874 by Henry Pochin, on the edge of Snowdonia
Bodysgallen Hall	House, Gardens, Parkland	2008	Llandudno; LL30 1RS; 53.2966°N 3.80279°W	Bodysgallen, Llandudno	17th century house with gardens and coastal parkland. nb. access only for customers at the hotel, Restaurant or Spa.
Conwy Suspension Bridge	Bridge	1965	Conwy; LL32 8LD; 53.281128°N 3.828009°W	Suspension bridge, Tubular bridge and Conwy Castle	1820 Thomas Telford bridge anchored to the walls of Conwy Castle
Tŷ Mawr Wybrnant	Upland farmhouse	1951	Nr Betws-y-Coed; LL25 0HJ; 53.052502°N 3.83218°W	Tŷ Mawr Wybrnant	Stonebuilt farmhouse in the Conwy Valley. Birthplace of Bishop William Morgan who translated the Bible into Welsh in 1588.
Ysbyty Ifan	Agricultural estate	1951	Ysbyty Ifan; LL24 0NP; 53.024175°N 3.7293937°W	Bridge over the Conwy, Ysbyty Ifan	The largest NT agricultural estate, 20,316 acres (8,222 ha) with 51 farms and 39 miles of footpaths. Formerly part of Lord Penrhyn's estates.

== Gwynedd ==
List of National Trust properties in Gwynedd
Site Name	Property type	Year acquired	Location	Image	Description
Carneddau and Glyderau	Mountains	1951	Nant Ffrancon; LL57 3LX; 53.1236°N 4.0204°W	Lynn Bochlwyd and the Glyder range	21,000 acres (8,500 ha) of Snowdonia mountains, formerly part of the estates of Lord Penrhyn. It now has over 100 kilometres (62 miles) of footpaths.
Craflwyn and Beddgelert	Mountains and woods	1994	LL55 4NG; 53.0199°N 4.0886°W	Coed Craflwyn	Valley sides of Nant Gwynant, above the Llyn Gwynant and Llyn Dinas lakes near Beddgelert.
Dolmelynllyn Estate	Woodland, farmland and hotel	1936	Ganllwyd, Nr Dolgellau; LL57 3LX; 52.8017°N 3.89006°W	Coed Dolmelynllyn woodlands from Berth-lwyd	200 year old oak plantation, Coed Ganllwyd National Nature reserve and Rhaeadr Ddu waterfalls are some of the highlights of the area. Dolmelynllyn Hall is now a hotel.
Hafod y Llan	Upland farm	1998	Craflwyn, Beddgelert; LL55 4NG; 53.0199°N 4.0886°W	Farm boundary wall between Hafod y Porth and Hafod y Llan	In terms of land area, the largest of the National Trust farms, stretching from Nant Gwynant to the summit of Snowdon.
Llanbedrog Beach	Coastline	2000	Llŷn Peninsula; LL53 7TT; 52.8553°N 4.48187°W	Beach huts, Llanbedrog beach	Beachhuts on the sandy beach, with woodland and the nearby headland of Mynydd Tir y Cwmwd
Ogwen Cottage	Information Point	2014	Bangor; LL57 3LZ; 53.1233°N 4.01877°W	Ogwen Cottage and Llyn Ogwen	Information and activity hub for Snowdonia, Formerly an outdoor pursuit centre.
Penrhyn Castle	Neo-gothic castle	2014	Nant Ffrancon; LL57 4HT; 53.2259°N 4.09526°W	Penrhyn Castle	19th century mansion, opulent interiors, railway museum, 60 acres (24 ha) of gardens and parkland
Plas yn Rhiw	Manor House	1952	Rhiw, LL53 8AB; 52.8234°N 4.68544°W	Plas yn Rhiw	16th century manor house, with Georgian additions, restored by three 'Keating sisters' who acquired in a run down state in 1938.
Porth Meudwy	Coastline	1990	Llŷn Peninsula; LL53 8DA; 52.8004°N 4.73193°W	Porth Meudwy	Cove near Aberdaron, embarkation point for Bardsey Island
Porth y Swnt	Interpretation centre	2010	Aberdaron; LL53 8BE; 52.8048°N 4.7117°W	The centre of the village of Aberdaron	Information and exhibits on Llŷn and Bardsey Island culture, heritage and environment, in the centre of Aberdaron.
Porthdinllaen	Fishing village	1994	Llŷn Peninsula; LL53 6DA; 52.9436°N 4.56877°W	Porthdinllaen from the beach	Traditional fishing village perched on a narrow headland near Morfa Nefyn on the Llŷn Peninsula north coast.
Porthor	Coastline	1981	Aberdaron; LL53 8LG; 52.8320°N 4.72328°W	Porthor - The whistling sands	Sandy bay at the very tip of Llŷn, with sands that reputedly 'whistle' when walked on.
Segontium	Roman fort	1937	Caernarfon; LL55 2LN; 53.13679°N 4.26526°W	Excavated foundations of the Roman fort of Segontium	Extensive excavated foundations behind houses on the outskirts of Caernarfon, Wales. The site is owned by the National Trust, and managed by Cadw.

== Monmouthshire ==
List of National Trust properties in Monmouthshire
Site Name	Property type	Year acquired	Location	Image	Description
Clytha Park	House, folly and estate	1950?	Nr Raglan; NP7 9BW; 51.77178°N 2.92728°W	Clytha Park - 19th century house	The 1830s house is occupied by tenants, so is not normally open. Clytha Castle, a 'folly' from the 1790s is used for Landmark Trust holiday rentals.
The Kymin	Hill-top Banqueting House	1902	Monmouth; NP25 3SF; 51.8091°N 2.6832°W	The Kymin - geograph.org.uk - 1499141	'The Round House' was built in 1792 to improve facilities for picnics by the local gentry. A nearby Naval memorial lists famous 18th century admirals.
Skenfrith Castle	Castle	1936	Nr Abergavenny; NP7 8UH; 51.8778°N 2.7894°W	Skenfrith Castle	Ruins of a 13th-century castle, which has origins in the Norman conquest of South Wales.

== Neath Port Talbot ==
List of National Trust properties in Neath Port Talbot
Site Name	Property type	Year acquired	Location	Image	Description
Aberdulais Tin Works and Waterfall	Industrial archaeology	1980	Neath Valley; SA10 9EU; 51.6807°N 3.77791°W	Waterwheel, Aberdulais	Industrial activity began in 1584 with copper production. In the 19th century it produced tin plate for the world, powered by water. The big wheel and a turbine still utilise water power next to the waterfall.

== Newport ==
List of National Trust properties in Newport
Site Name	Property type	Year acquired	Location	Image	Description
Tredegar House	Mansion	2012	Newport; NP10 8YW; 51.5616°N 3.0281°W	Tredegar House	17th century mansion of the Morgan family, with stables and parkland

== Pembrokeshire ==
List of National Trust properties in Pembrokeshire
Site Name	Property type	Year acquired	Location	Image	Description
Cilgerran Castle	Castle	1938	Nr Cardigan; SA43 2SF; 52.0574°N 4.63413°W	Castle at Cilgerran	ruins of 13th century castle above the Teifi Gorge - in the guardianship of Cadw.
Colby Woodland Garden	Woodland	1980	Amroth; SA67 8PP; 51.7420°N 4.6717°W	Colby Woodland Garden	Woodland gardens in a 'secret valley' above Saundersfoot Bay
Marloes Sands and Mere	Coastline and wetland	1941	Marloes peninsular SA62 3BH; 51.7266°N 5.2188°W	Raggle Rocks at Marloes Sands	Long sandy beach with interesting rock formations. The mere is an SSSI notable for its birdlife.
Martin's Haven	Coastline	1981	Marloes peninsular SA62 3BJ; 51.7346°N 5.24253°W	Ferry at Martin's Haven	
Cleddau Woodlands	Woodland		Lawrenny; SA68 0PR; 51.7192°N 4.8780°W	Hills and woods around Lawrenny Quay	Wooded valleys along the Cleddau Estuary.
Solva Coast	Coastline		St David's; SA62 6UT; 51.8740°N 5.18866°W	Solva Harbour	Solva Harbour is the central point in an 8 miles (13 km) stretch of National Trust coastline along the north side of St Brides Bay.
Southwood Estate	Coastline and farmland	2003	Mathry; SA62 5HE; 51.848127°N 5.1088°W	View from Ty Coed De over Southwood	Small fields and copses with views over St Brides Bay, running down to the cliffs and coast path.
Stackpole	Coastline and wetlands	1976	Nr Pembroke; SA71 5DQ; 51.612813°N 4.926159°W	Stackpole Quay and Cliffs	Remnant of an ancient estate with now demolished mansion. The wetlands are man-made lakes and the spectacular cliffs and bays include Barafundle Bay and Broadhaven
St Davids Peninsula and Visitor Centre	Coastline and Information point	1974	St Davids; SA62 6SD; 51.8803°N 5.2629°W	Porthclais harbour	Coastline at Porthclais and Whitesands. Visitor centre and shop in the centre of St David's
Tudor Merchant's House, Tenby	House	1937	Tenby; SA70 7BX; 51.6713°N 4.6971°W	Tudor Merchant's House on Quay Hill	15th century merchant's house with replica Tudor furniture

== Powys ==
List of National Trust properties in Powys
Site Name	Property type	Year acquired	Location	Image	Description
Abergwesyn Common	Open Country		Nr Llanwtyd Wells; 52.1606°N 3.6767°W	Abergwesyn Common	Twelve mile wide expanse of remote mid-Wales, crossed by a few minor roads, and dotted with prehistoric and medieval sites.
Powis Castle & Garden	Castle and gardens	1952	Welshpool; SY21 8RF; 52.6492°N 3.1576°W	Powis Castle	13th century castle that evolved into the country seat of the Herbert family, surrounded by elaborate gardens in French and Italianate styles
Brecon Beacons	NationalPark	1936	e.g. Pont ar Daf; LD3 8NL; 51.8691°N 3.4731°W	The Brecon Beacons	Mountain tracts such as those around Pen y Fan, Sugar Loaf and Ysgyryd Fawr, and glaciated valleys, and waterfalls such as Sgwd Henrhyd

== Swansea ==
List of National Trust properties in Swansea
Site Name	Property type	Year acquired	Location	Image	Description
Rhossili and south Gower coast	Coastline	1933	Gower; SA3 1PR; 51.5685°N 4.2869°W	Fall Bay, south of Rhossili headland	The UK's first Area of Outstanding Natural Beauty, with visitor centre and headlands and bays from Rhossili Bay and Worm's Head south around the peninsular.
Pennard, Pwll Du and Bishopston Valley	Coastline	1954	southgate SA3 2DH; 51.5669°N 4.0878°W	Bishopston Valley opening onto Pwll Du Bay	Cliffs, caves, a wooded valley and Pwll Du headland with views to the mumbles.
Whiteford and North Gower	Coastline		Cheriton; 51.6300°N 4.2503°W	Whiteford Sands	Saltmarsh, mudflats and sand dunes, with heathland inland

== Vale of Glamorgan ==
List of National Trust properties in Vale of Glamorgan
Site Name	Property type	Year acquired	Location	Image	Description
Dyffryn Gardens	Gardens	2012	St Nicholas; CF5 6SU; 51.4376°N 3.3042°W	Dyffryn House and Gardens	Edwardian designed by Thomas Mawson in 1906 for John Cory, over 55 acres (22 ha). Within the gardens is Dyffryn House, a Victorian mansion, acquired unfurnished in 2013 and under restoration. By 2016 some rooms were open and furnished with 'hands-on' items that can be played with.

== Wrexham ==
List of National Trust properties in Wrexham
Site Name	Property type	Year acquired	Location	Image	Description
Chirk Castle	Castle	1981	Chirk; LL14 5AF; 52.9359°N 3.0835°W	Chirk Castle, Main Approach	14th century castle of the time of Edward I, aggrandised over several hundred years by the Myddleton family, and in the 20th century by Lord Howard de Waldon.
Erddig	Mansion and estate	1973	Wrexham; LL13 0YT; 53.0273°N 3.00296°W	Erddig, side entrance	Eighteenth century mansion set in gardens and parkland, within a 1,200 acres (490 ha) estate. Extensive preserved servants quarters and estate workshops, and family rooms of the Yorke family and their predecessors.

== See also ==
- List of Cadw properties
- List of National Trust properties in England
- List of National Trust properties in Northern Ireland
- List of National Trust for Scotland properties
