= List of National Trust for Scotland properties =

National Trust for Scotland properties is a link page listing the cultural, built and natural heritage properties and sites owned or managed by the National Trust for Scotland.

== Aberdeen and Grampian ==
- Castle Fraser, Garden & Estate
- Craigievar Castle
- Crathes Castle, Garden & Estate
- Drum Castle, Garden & Estate
- Fyvie Castle
- Haddo House
- Leith Hall, Garden & Estate
- Mar Lodge Estate & Mar Lodge
- Pitmedden Garden

== Angus ==
- Barry Water Mill
- Finavon Doocot
- House of Dun & Montrose Basin Nature Reserve
- J. M. Barrie's Birthplace, Kirriemuir

== Argyll, Bute and Loch Lomond ==
- Arduaine Garden
- Ben Lomond
- Bucinch & Ceardach
- Crarae Garden
- Geilston Garden, Cardross
- Hill House, Helensburgh
- Tighnabruaich Viewpoint

== Ayrshire and Arran ==
- Bachelors' Club, Tarbolton
- Brodick Castle, Garden & Country Park
- Culzean Castle & Country Park
- Goatfell
- Robert Burns Birthplace Museum
- Souter Johnnie's Cottage

== Central Scotland ==
- Alloa Tower
- Bannockburn
- Ben Lawers National Nature Reserve
- Cunninghame Graham Memorial
- Dollar Glen
- Menstrie Castle
- Moirlanich Longhouse
- The Dunmore Pineapple

== Dumfries & Galloway ==
- Broughton House & Garden
- Bruce's Stone, at the site of the Battle of Glen Trool
- Grey Mare's Tail Nature Reserve
- Murray Isles
- Rockcliffe
- Thomas Carlyle's Birthplace
- Threave House & Gardens
- Venniehill

== Edinburgh & the Lothians ==
- Bute House
- Caiy Stane
- Gladstone's Land
- House of the Binns
- Inveresk Lodge Garden
- Malleny House and Garden
- Newhailes
- No 28 Charlotte Square
- Preston Mill & Phantassie Doocot
- Georgian House

== Fife ==
- Balmerino Abbey
- Falkland Palace, Garden & Old Burgh
- Hill of Tarvit Mansionhouse & Garden
- Kellie Castle & Garden
- The Royal Burgh of Culross

== Greater Glasgow and Clydesdale ==
- Black Hill
- Cameronians' Regimental Memorial
- David Livingstone Centre
- Greenbank Garden
- Holmwood House
- Hutchesons' Hall
- Kittochside, The Museum of Scottish Country Life
- Parklea, Port Glasgow
- Pollok House
- Tenement House (Glasgow)
- Weaver's Cottage
- Willow Tearooms

== Inverness, Nairn, Moray & The Black Isle ==
- Boath Doocot
- Brodie Castle
- Culloden
- Miller House and Hugh Miller's Cottage

== Lochaber ==
- Glencoe & Dalness
- Glenfinnan Monument

== Northern Isles ==
- Fair Isle
- Parcels of land on the islands of Unst and Yell

== Perthshire ==
- Branklyn Garden
- Craigower
- Dunkeld
- Killiecrankie
- Linn of Tummel
- The Hermitage

== Ross-shire ==
- Balmacara Estate & Lochalsh Woodland Garden
- Corrieshalloch Gorge National Nature Reserve
- Falls of Glomach
- Inverewe Garden
- Kintail & Morvich
- Shieldaig Island
- Strome Castle
- Torridon
- West Affric

== Scottish Borders ==
- Harmony Garden
- Priorwood Garden
- Robert Smail's Printing Works
- St Abb's Head National Nature Reserve

== West Coast Islands ==
- Burg, Isle of Mull
- Canna & Sanday
- Iona
- Macquarie Mausoleum, Isle of Mull
- Mingulay, Berneray & Pabbay
- St Kilda World Heritage Site
- Staffa National Nature Reserve
- Treshnish Islands

== See also ==
- List of National Trust properties in England
- List of National Trust properties in Wales
- List of National Trust properties in Northern Ireland
- Conservation in the United Kingdom
