= The National Trust for Scotland Foundation USA =

Charity organisation in Scotland

The National Trust for Scotland Foundation USA describes itself as a charity that "encourages Americans to participate in the care of the cultural and natural treasures protected by The National Trust for Scotland, ensuring that the heritage shared by Scots and Americans is safeguarded for current and future generations."

== History ==
The foundation was established in 2000 and is an independent sister organization of the National Trust for Scotland, supporting its activities while raising awareness of the shared heritage between Scotland and the United States. As of 2013, the foundation has 3 full-time staff members, and the current chairman of the board is Helen Sayles. The National Trust for Scotland Foundation USA, Inc. was incorporated as a not-for-profit 501(c)(3) corporation under the laws of the Commonwealth of Massachusetts on March 30, 2000. It is a publicly supported charity governed by a board of trustees.

The National Trust for Scotland Foundation USA has granted more than $6.7 million to support the work of the National Trust for Scotland since 2000. The National Trust for Scotland owns and manages around 130 properties and 180,000 acres (730 km2) of land, including castles, ancient small dwellings, historic sites, gardens, and remote rural areas.

== Membership ==
Annual membership of the Trust starts at $50 per annum, and allows free admission to over 129 properties owned by the National Trust for Scotland, as well as providing free entry to sister National Trust Organizations in the rest of the United Kingdom and Australia. The organization's magazine, Scotland in Trust, is published three times a year and is available to members. The Trust has an independent sister organization in Canada, The Canadian Trust for Scotland Foundation.

== See also ==
- List of National Trust for Scotland properties
- National Trust for Scotland
