= Ceardach =

Island in Scotland

Coordinates: 56°5′32″N 4°35′13″W

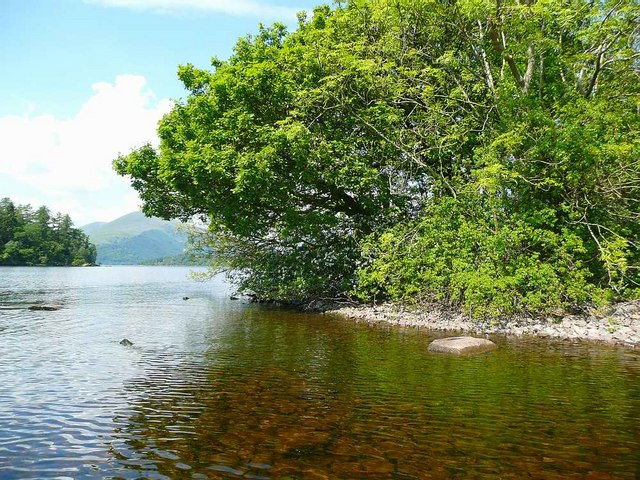
- The shore of Ceardach

Location
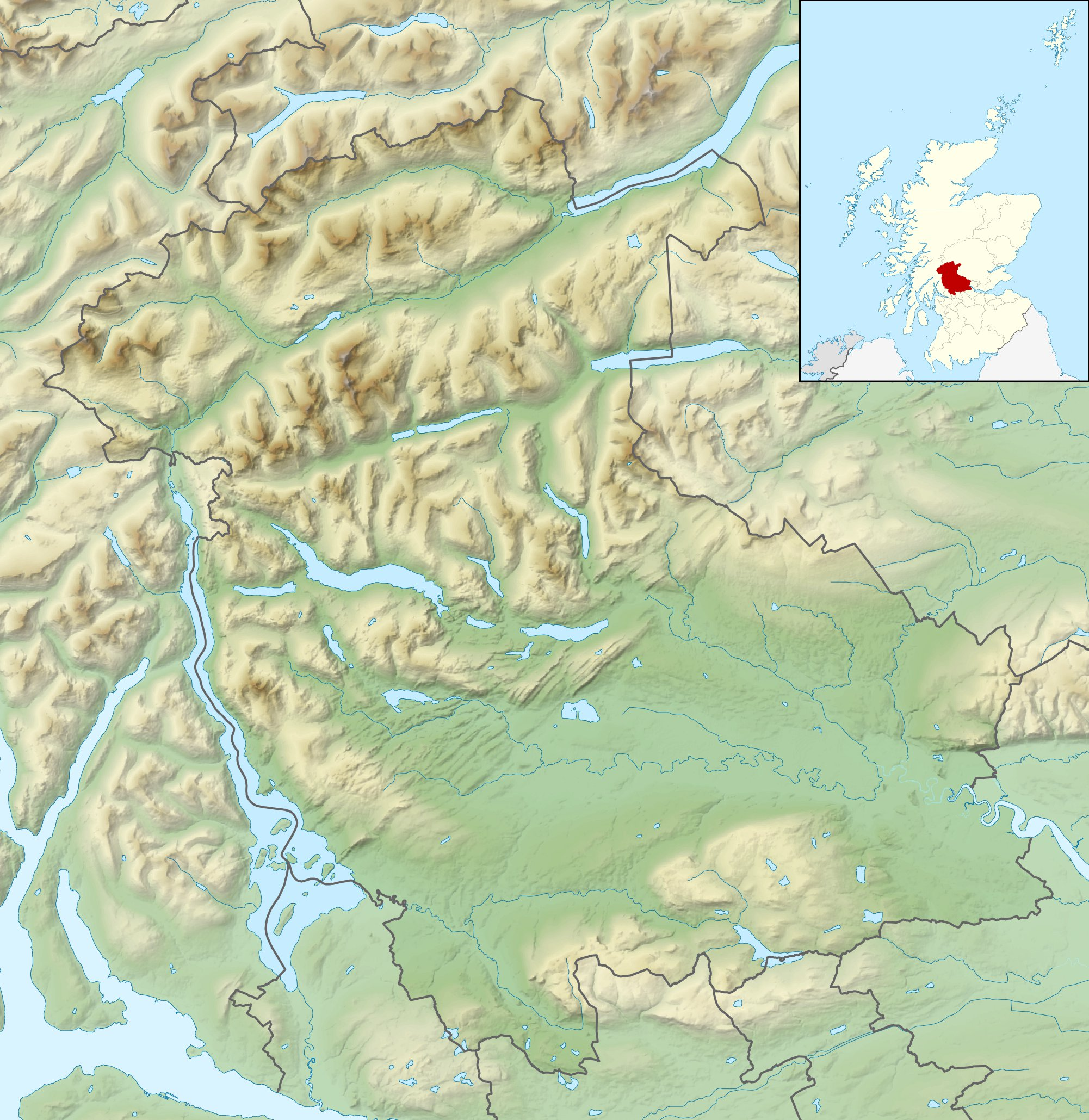
- Ceardach shown within Stirling

Name
- Name meaning: Smithy

Administration
- Council area: Stirling
- Country: Scotland
- Sovereign state: United Kingdom

Demographics
- Population: 0

Ceardach is a small uninhabited island in Loch Lomond, in west central Scotland. The island lies east of Bucinch and north of Inchcruin. The name Ceardach means a smithy.

== History ==
Ceardach may have been the site of an Iron Age bloomery or furnace for smelting iron ore.

Along with its neighbour, Bucinch, the island, was donated to the National Trust for Scotland by Col. Charles L. Spencer of Warmanbie, Dumfries, in 1943.

== Flora ==
A large variety of trees and other plants grow on the island, from seeds brought by birds, wind and water. There is a mature if stunted oak tree, willow, holly, briar, and bramble.
