= Dundrum Bay =

Bay in County Down, Northern Ireland

- Cuan Dhún Droma (Irish)
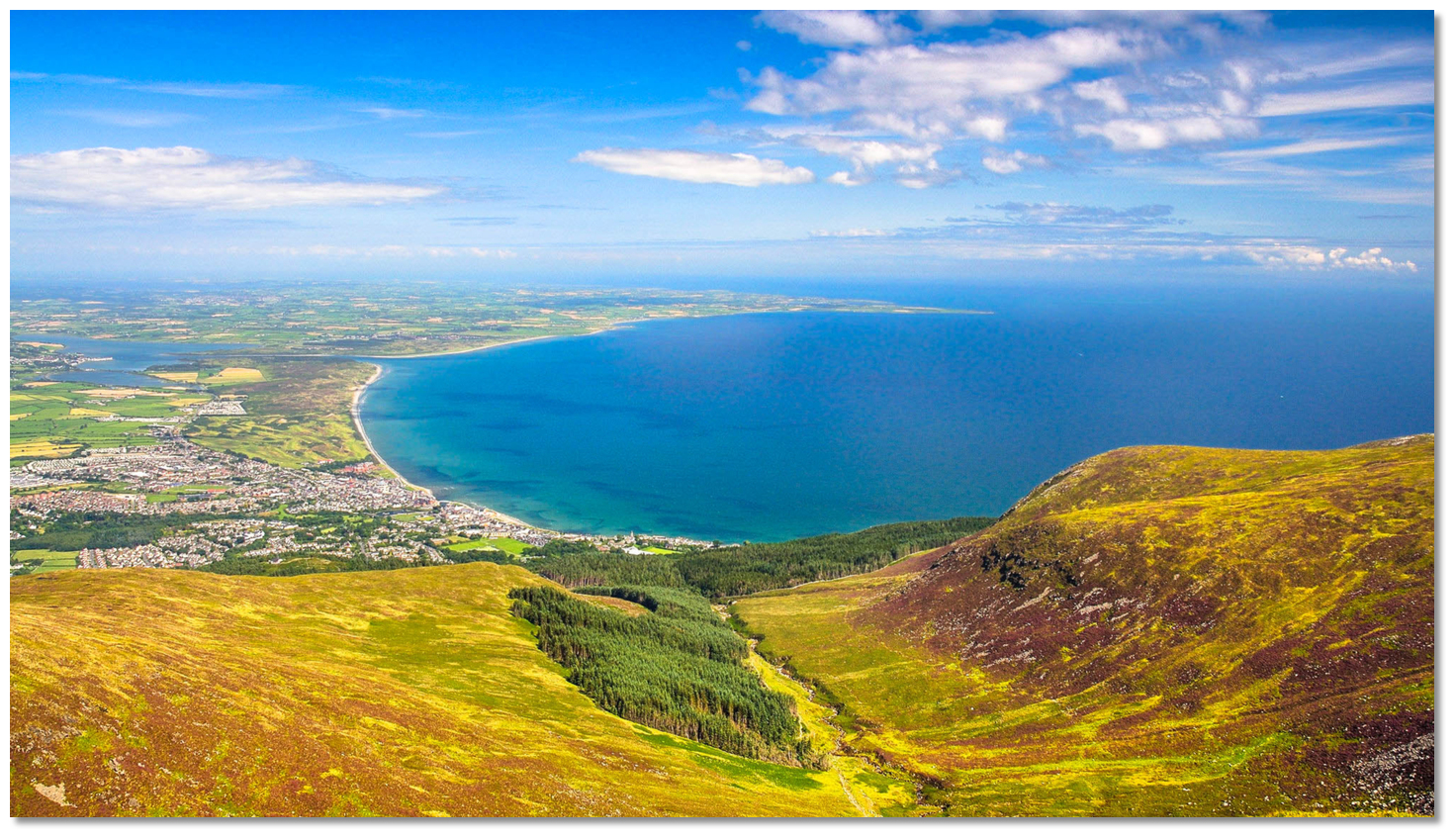
- Dundrum Bay from the Mourne Mountains
- Interactive map of Dundrum Bay
- Location: County Down, Northern Ireland
- Coordinates: 54°13′43″N 5°46′9″W
- Type: Bay
- Part of: Irish Sea
- Primary inflows: Carrigs River, Moneycarragh River, Blackstaff River, Ardilea River
- Primary outflows: Irish Sea
- Basin countries: United Kingdom
- Designation: Area of Special Scientific Interest (ASSI), part of Murlough Nature Reserve
- Sections/sub-basins: Inner Bay, Outer Bay
- Settlements: Dundrum, Newcastle, Ballykinler

Dundrum Bay is a bay on the Irish Sea coast of County Down, Northern Ireland. The larger Outer Bay stretches from the Mourne Mountains at Newcastle to Saint John's Point. The smaller Inner Bay was historically called Murlough; it is an almost landlocked estuary overlooked by the village of Dundrum and connected to the Outer Bay by a narrow channel. Between the two is the Murlough spit, which is a dune heathland.

== History ==
Inner Dundrum Bay, a tidal estuary, was formerly known as Murlough. This comes from Irish Murlach 'lagoon', but was originally Murbholg, literally 'sea pouch' or 'sea bag'. In early Irish literature, it was also known as Loch Rudraige or Loch Rudhraighe ('sea inlet of Rudraige', a personal or tribal name), sometimes anglicised as 'Loch Rury' or 'Lough Rury' in modern translations. It is the setting of the medieval tale of Fergus mac Léti, a king of Ulster who defeats a monster under its waters.

Walter Harris wrote in 1744 that the 'North and South Tides meeting off this Bay and breaking upon St John's Point occasion a greater eddy or suction inwards than in other places; for many ships have found themselves embayed.' Local historian John W Hanna described in the 1860s how 'not a foot of the shore from St John's Point to Annalong but has from time to time been strewn with the broken masts and timbers of Royal and merchant ships.' The worst loss of life was 74 crew and 11 fishing boats on 13 January 1843.

=== SS Great Britain ===
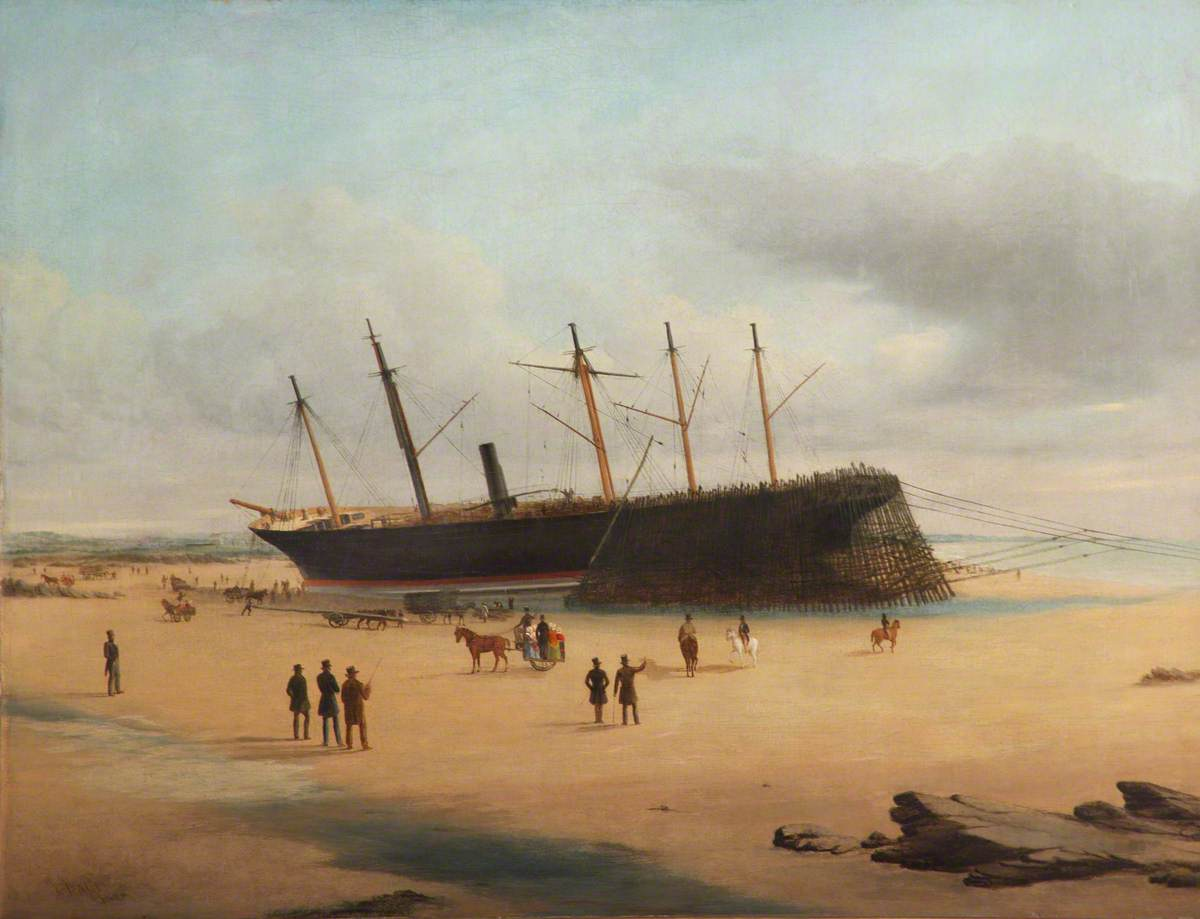
SS Great Britain stranded ashore in 1846

The bay was home to the SS Great Britain for a year having run aground on a sandbar in 1846. In 1846, the SS Great Britain, an innovative iron-hulled steamship designed by Isambard Kingdom Brunel, ran aground in Dundrum Bay, Northern Ireland, due to a navigational error. Though no lives were lost, the ship remained stranded for nearly a year before being successfully salvaged in 1847 using pioneering techniques. In 2024, archaeologists from the University of Bristol used magnetic survey equipment to locate the exact grounding site at Tyrella Beach, identifying a buried ring of iron debris matching the ship’s shape.

=== Dundrum Harbour ===
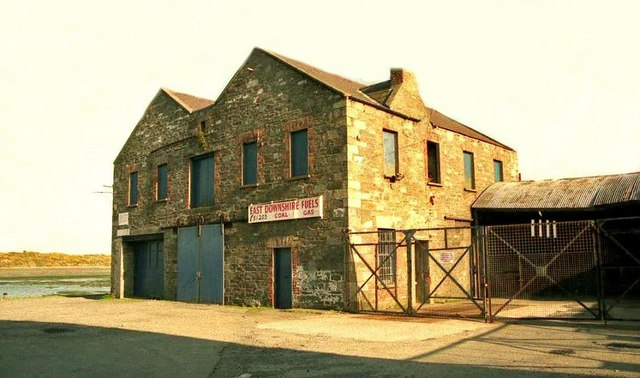
Old coal store at Dundrum Harbour

The harbour, located at the head of Dundrum Bay, was historically a small tidal port used primarily for importing coal and occasionally exporting pit props. Due to increasing ship sizes and the navigational challenges posed by a shifting sandbar, commercial operations ceased in 1984. The harbour, once operated by the East Downshire Steamship Company, fell into disrepair by the late 1990s, with several buildings, including a former coal store, left decaying. Since then, the area has been redeveloped for residential use, with apartment complexes now overlooking the estuary. The harbour lies within a hammerhead-shaped tidal inlet, accessed via a narrow channel through sand hills, and is overlooked by the ruins of a Norman castle. The nearby village of Dundrum sits behind the quay.

== Dune systems ==
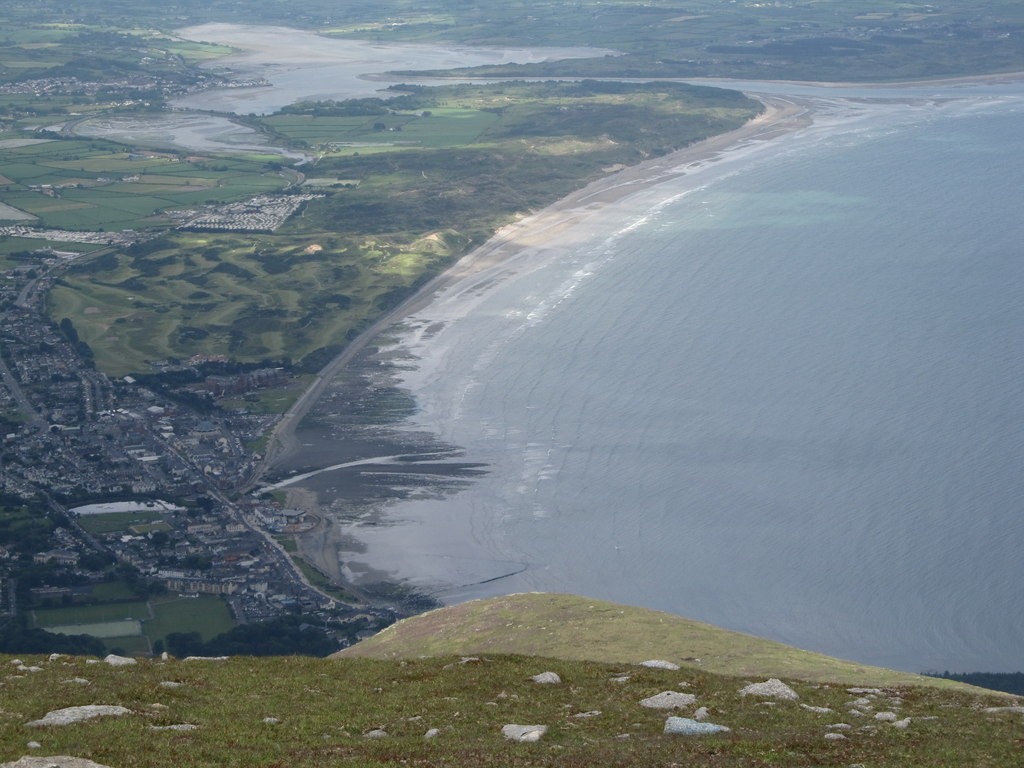
Murlough spit and its dune heathland, separating the Outer Bay (right) from the Inner Bay (top left). The town of Newcastle is at bottom left.

The Dundrum Bay complex is located on the southeast coast of County Down, Northern Ireland. It includes four main natural features: the Murlough and Ballykinler dune systems, and Dundrum Outer and Inner Bays. The area stretches from St. John’s Point in the east to the Mourne Mountains in the southwest, focusing specifically on the section between Craigalea Rocks and the mouth of the Glen River in Newcastle.

The geological history of the area was first noted in an 1871 Geological Survey map, which showed raised beaches and ancient sea levels behind the dune systems. Interest in the area grew in the 1950s and 60s when researcher Stephens studied the Murlough dunes, particularly the raised gravel ridges. He linked these features to sea level changes during the mid-Holocene period (around 6000–5000 years ago). Although Stephens published limited detailed findings, his work influenced later interpretations of sea level changes along Ireland’s east coast.

== Coastal path ==
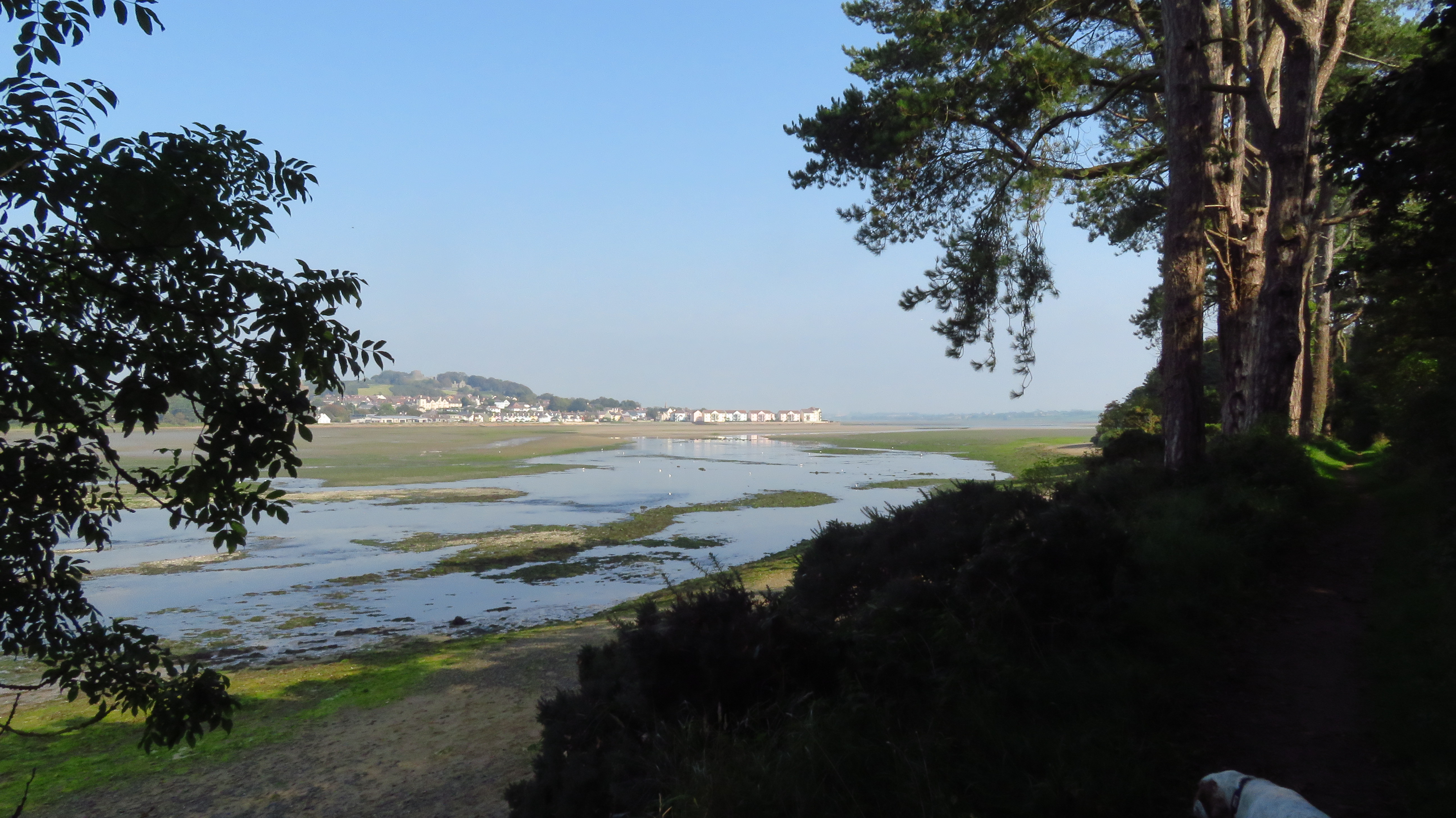
View of Dundrum from the coastal path

The Dundrum Coastal Path, a part of the larger Lecale Way, is a hiking trail that winds along the fronts of the bay; the trek is sometimes visited by birdwatchers. The Blackstaff River, Ardilea, Moneycarragh and the Carrigs River all empty into the bay. The inner bay comprises extensive tidal mud and sand flats and is important for wintering wildfowl.

The walk begins at The Quay in Dundrum. Common species in this area include oystercatchers, curlews, dunlins, knots, turnstones, redshanks, and godwits. From The Quay, the route follows a promenade toward Main Street, then continues along a grassy path marked for Keel Point. The route follows Keel Point driveway to Downshire Bridge, a three-arched stone bridge built in 1802 to replace an earlier wooden structure. On the far side of this bridge, the path drops to the shoreline. At low tide, the bay becomes largely exposed, revealing mudflats. Past an old boathouse, a signpost directs inland through shrubby woodland to Murlough House. A boardwalk near the house leads back toward the Outer Bay. A second boardwalk, further along the shore, leads inland through Murlough National Nature Reserve. This reserve contains a 6,000-year-old sand dune system that supports a variety of protected wildlife habitats. The route subsequently forks right where two boardwalks meet. It continues along a gravel track that follows the edge of Dundrum Inner Bay. The birdlife in this section includes little egrets, herons, and lapwings. The track eventually reconnects with Downshire Bridge and Keel Point Road. The final part of the walk includes a climb to Dundrum Castle.

== Gallery ==
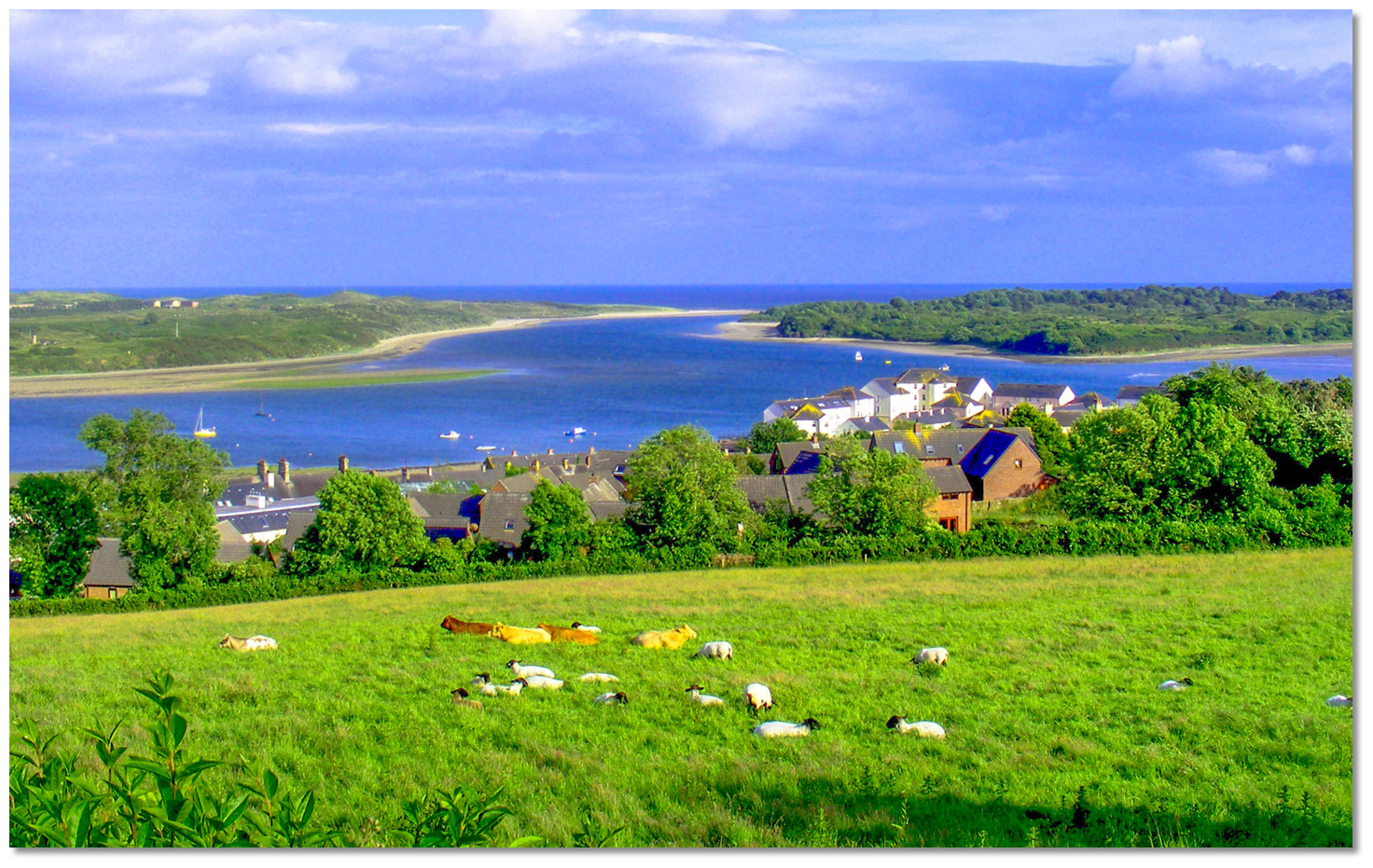
The Inner Bay from above Dundrum

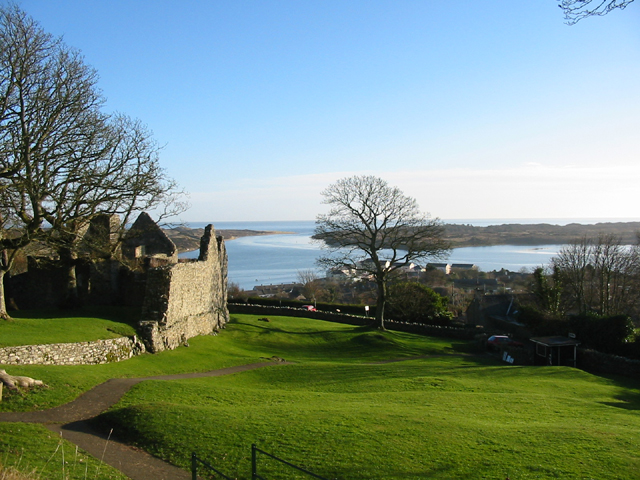
Inner Bay viewed from Dundrum Castle

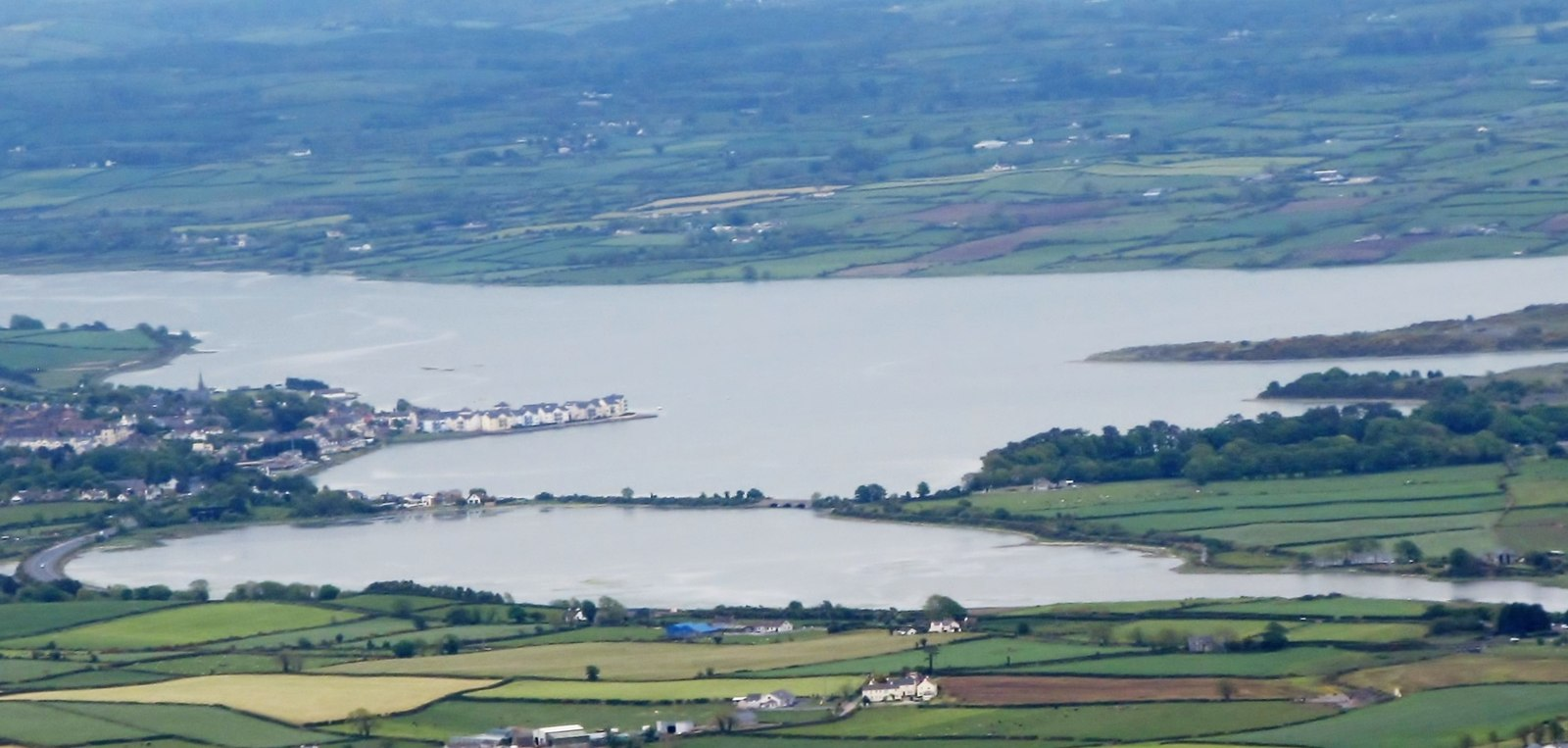
Inner Bay from the Mourne Mountains

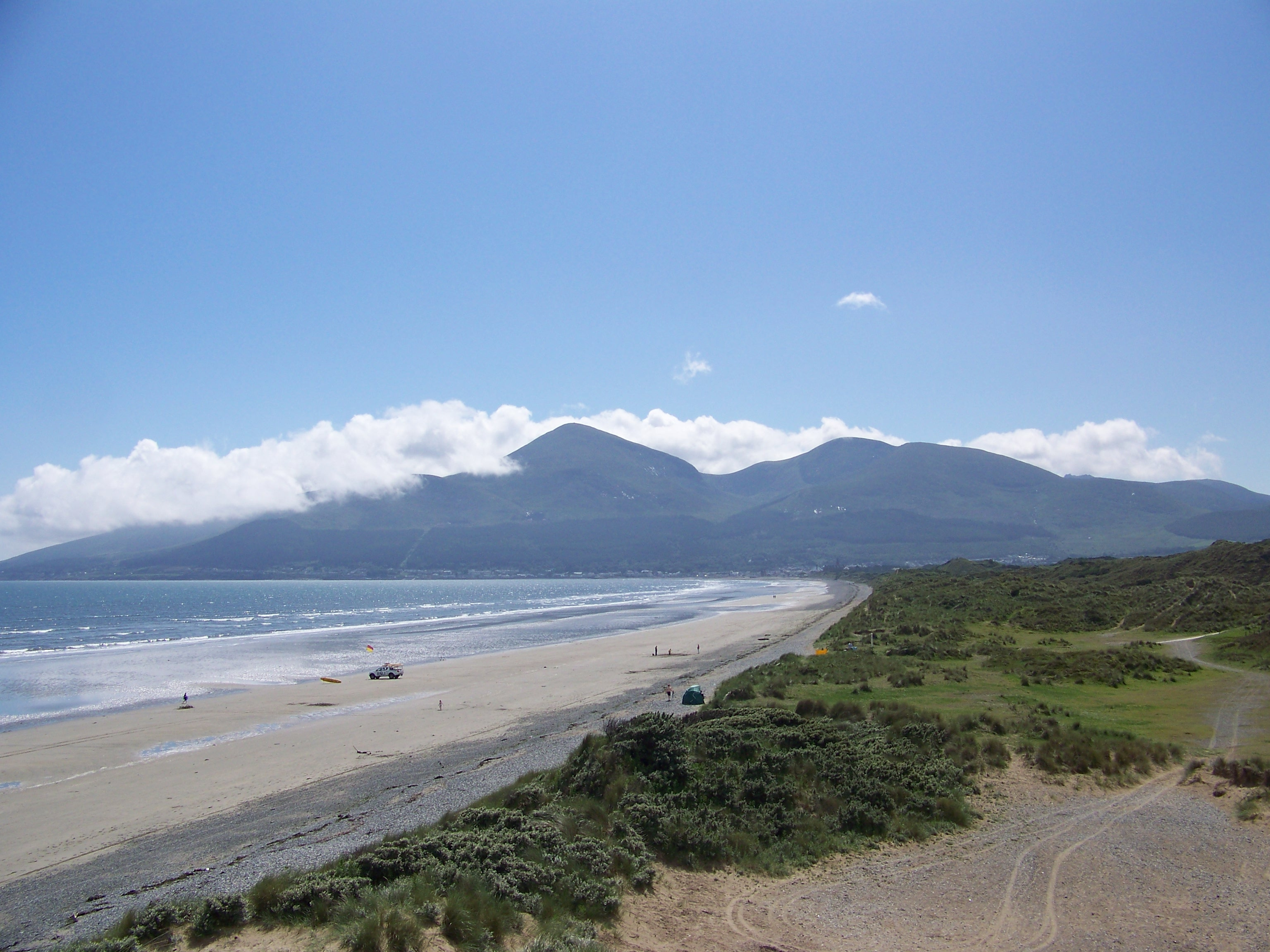
Murlough Beach looking toward the Mourne Mountains

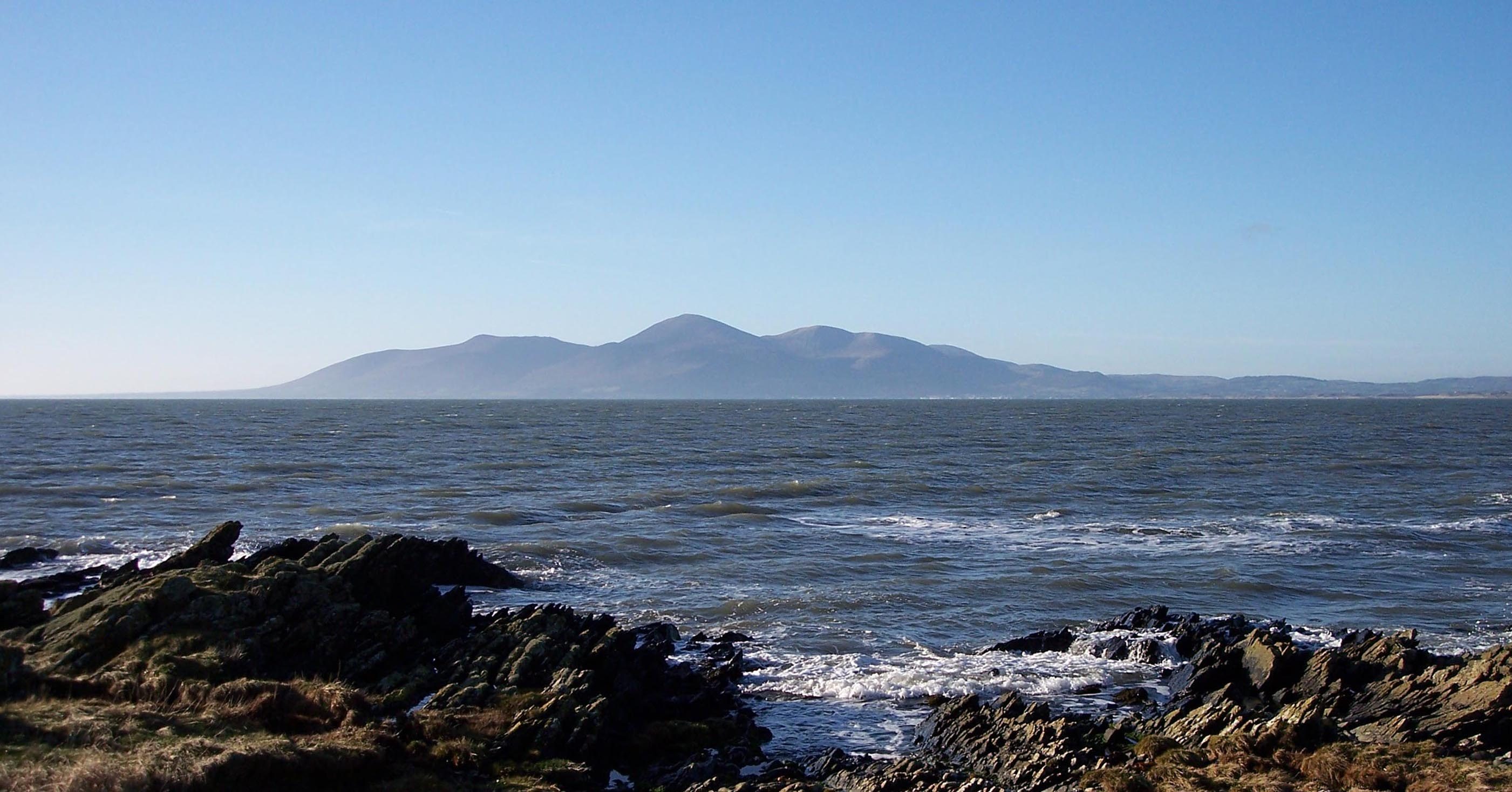
Looking across the Outer Bay from St John's Point
