= Bucinch =

Island in Scotland

Buc-Innis (Gaelic)

Location
- Location within Scotland
- OS grid reference: NS387918
- Coordinates: 56.09°N 4.59°W

Name
- Name meaning: Buck, or Male Goat Island

Physical geography
- Island group: Loch Lomond
- Area: ha
- Highest elevation: 24 m (79 ft)

Administration
- Council area: Stirling
- Country: Scotland
- Sovereign state: United Kingdom

Demographics
- Population: 0

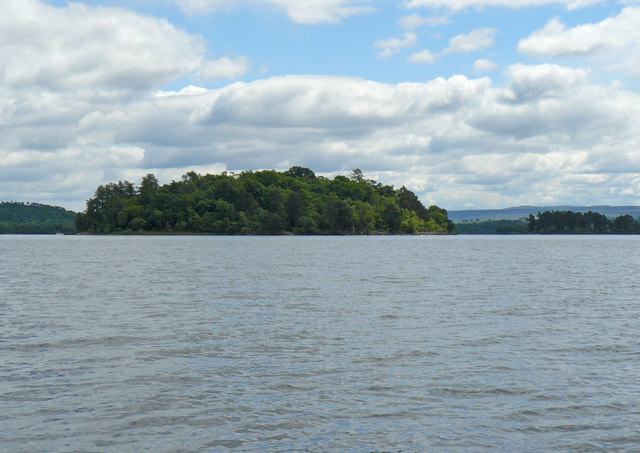
Bucinch

Bucinch or Buc-Innis (Scottish Gaelic: "Buck Island" or "Male Goat Island") is a small island in Loch Lomond, in west central Scotland.

The heavily wooded island lies due north of Inchcruin and rises steeply from a rocky coastline to 24 metres (79 feet) in a central summit.

Along with smaller neighbour, Ceardach, Bucinch was donated to the National Trust for Scotland by Col Charles L Spencer of Warmanbie, Dumfries, in 1943. Although uninhabited for centuries, there are remains of a stone jetty.
