= The Argory =

Historic Irish gentry house

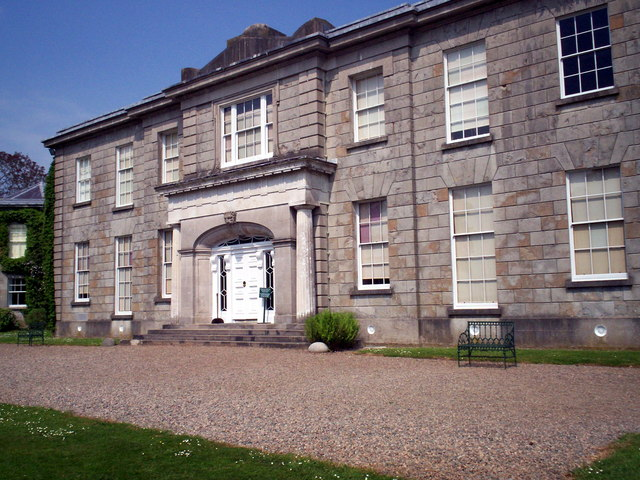
- The front façade of The Argory
- Interactive map of The Argory
- 54.4467°N 6.7006°W

History
- Built: 1820–1824
- Built for: Walter MacGeough Bond

Site notes
- Architect(s): Arthur and John Williamson
- Owner: National Trust
- Website: www.nationaltrust.org.uk/visit/northern-ireland/the-argory

The Argory is a 19th-century neo-classical country house and estate in County Armagh, Northern Ireland, near Moy and the River Blackwater. Built between 1820 and 1824 for Walter MacGeough Bond, it retains original interiors, a barrel organ, and extensive grounds. It remained in the MacGeough Bond family until 1979, when it was transferred to the National Trust. The estate is now open to the public as a historic house museum.

== History ==
Construction began in 1820, with Walter MacGeough Bond commissioning the house. Designed in a restrained neo‑classical style, it was completed in 1824. In 1822, MacGeough Bond ordered a large barrel organ for the entrance lobby. Built by James Bishop, it was originally intended to accompany family prayers and remains in place.

The property stayed in the family for more than 150 years. During the 20th century, it served as a military hospital during the Second World War. A fire in 1898 damaged the north wing and part of the organ's mechanism, and proposed alterations to the lobby were not carried out.

In 1979, the last resident family member donated the house, its contents, and surrounding lands to the National Trust.

== MacGeough Bond family ==
The MacGeough Bond family originated from the marriage of William McGeough and Elizabeth Bond, daughter and heiress of Walter Bond of Bondville, County Armagh. Their descendants adopted the combined surname MacGeough Bond.

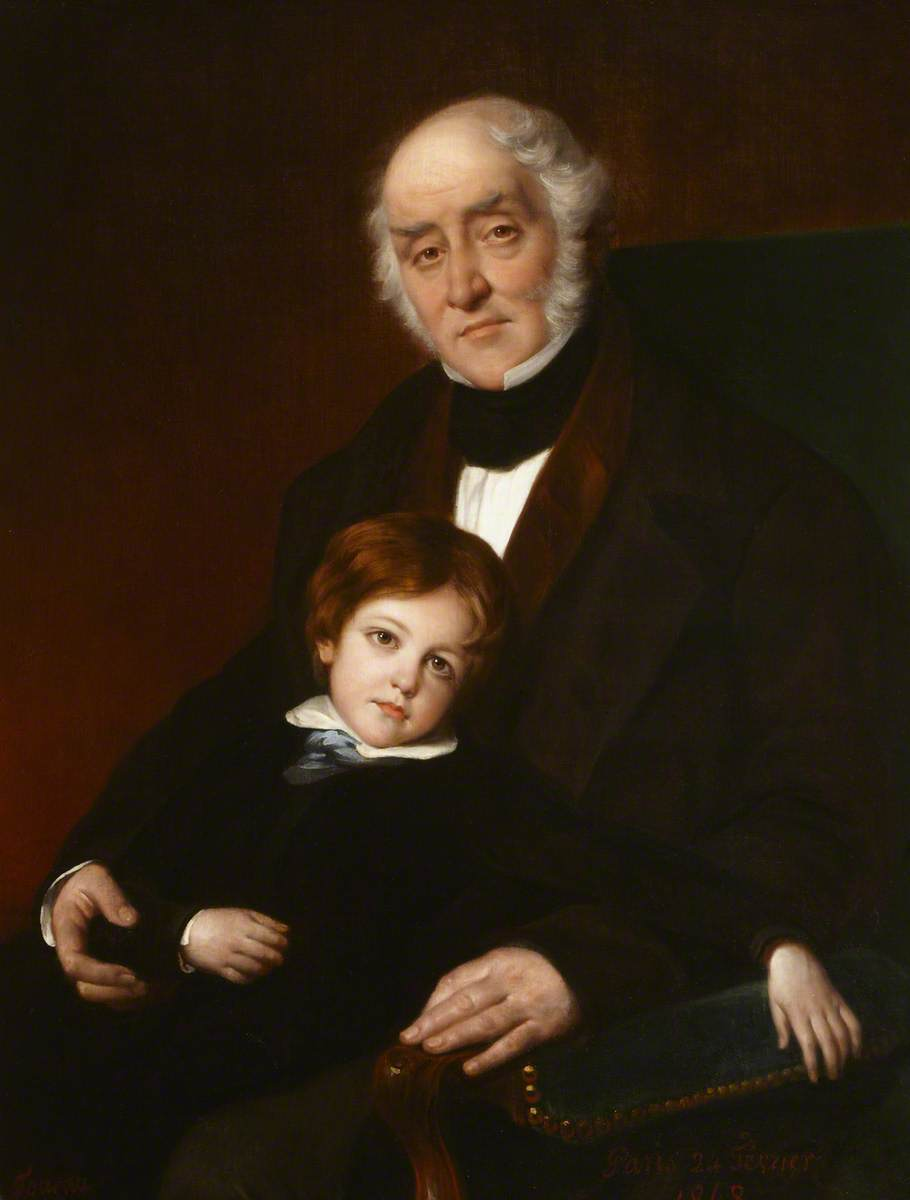
Walter MacGeough Bond (1790–1866) with his son Edward Staples MacGeough Bond (1842–1891), by Hugues Fourau, 1848.

Walter MacGeough Bond (1790–1866), a barrister, commissioned The Argory in the 1820s. In 1826, he married his first wife, Mary Isabella Joy, who died in 1829, leaving their daughter, Mary Isabella MacGeough Bond. In 1830, he married Anne Smyth, daughter of Ralph Smyth of Gaybrook, County Westmeath. They had six children, including Joshua, Ralph, William, and Edward; the identities of the remaining two are unconfirmed.

- Joshua Walter MacGeough Bond (1831–1905), who inherited the Drumsill estate.
- Ralph Shelton MacGeough Bond (1832–1916), who later used the name Ralph MacGeough Bond Shelton and held The Argory for a period.
- William MacGeough Bond (1836–1896), who owned lands in Armagh, Tyrone, and Westmeath during the 1870s.
- Edward Staples MacGeough Bond (1842–1891), a justice of the peace associated with the estate.

The estate later passed to Sir Walter William Adrian MacGeough Bond, grandson of the original Walter and son of Joshua. He served as a judge in the Cairo Court of Appeal from 1888 until 1916 and became its Vice‑President.

Sir Walter was succeeded by his nephew, Captain Walter Albert Nevill "Tommy" MacGeough Bond (1908–1986), son of Edward Staples MacGeough Bond. He was the final family resident at The Argory and maintained the house largely unchanged. He was buried on the estate grounds in 1986.

== Architecture and Interiors ==
The house, completed in 1824, was designed by Dublin‑based architects Arthur and John Williamson. Constructed from ashlar limestone, it has a symmetrical façade and a shallow hipped roof. The interior includes an entrance hall, reception rooms, and family quarters arranged across two storeys.

The entrance lobby contains the barrel organ installed in 1824. Built by James Bishop of London, it accompanied daily family prayers and remains in situ. Much of the interior has remained unchanged since the early 20th century, retaining original wallpapers, furnishings, and personal effects.

Other rooms include a library, drawing room, and dining room, furnished with period pieces and heirlooms. The service wing and courtyard retain original features such as a bell system and kitchen fittings.

== Estate and Grounds ==
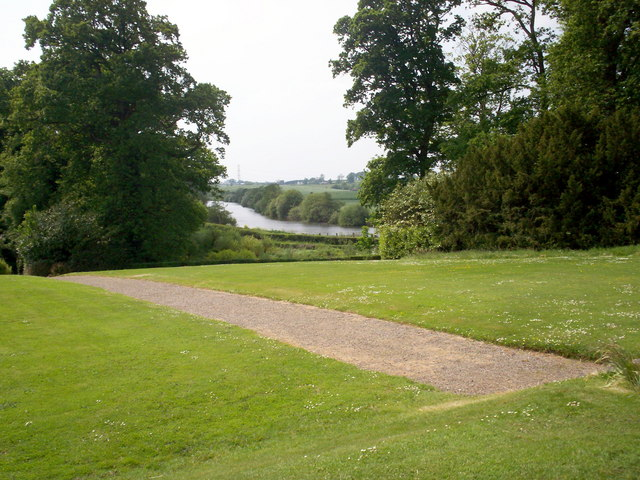
Front lawn of The Argory, with the River Blackwater in the background

Set within a 130‑hectare (320‑acre) wooded riverside landscape, the grounds overlook the River Blackwater and include formal gardens, pleasure walks, and mature parkland. Seasonal features include spring bulbs, rhododendrons, and views across the surrounding countryside.

== Collections and Archive ==
The house retains original furnishings, artworks, and decorative objects collected by the family. Items include the 17th‑century Doomer Cabinet, attributed to Dutch cabinetmaker Herman Doomer, and an acetylene lighting system preserved in several rooms.

A large archive of correspondence, photographs, diaries, and estate documents was preserved. Additional family papers dating from 1692 to 1861 are held at the Public Record Office of Northern Ireland (PRONI).
