= Mynydd Tir y Cwmwd =

Coordinates: 52.84873°N 4.48136°W

Mynydd Tir y Cwmwd (The Headland) is an area of about 175 acres (708,000 m^{2}) in north Wales to the south of the village of Llanbedrog.

From the top of the Headland, with a covering of gorse and heather, there are fine views towards Abersoch and Pwllheli as well as over Cardigan Bay. The whole area is privately owned common land and is zigzagged by many paths. Great care must be taken on the slope where numerous accidents have occurred.

Along the cliff coast are situated three disused granite quarries, relics of pre-war activity. At the sea end of the headland from the beach when the tide is out are the remains of the jetty that was used by ships to transport the stones from the quarries. The remains of the old quarry buildings can also be seen; one is a large hopper building, where stone setts that were cut at the quarry were stored before being transported by ship.

A "Tin Man" sculpture can be found on Llanbedrog headland from the beach, designed by local sculptors and installed in 2002. It replaced a 1980 metal sculpture by Simon van de Put which, in turn, replaced an original wooden man (a figurehead from a ship) which had been placed there by Cardiff businessman Solomon Andrews, but had been destroyed by vandals.

== See also ==
- Commote
