= Llanbedrog =

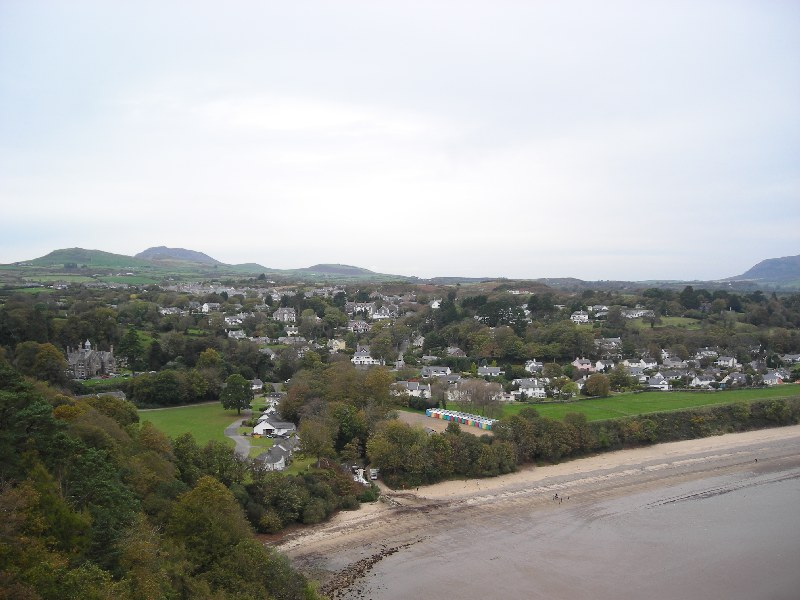
- View of village from the headland

- Location within Gwynedd
- Population: 1,002 (2011)
- OS grid reference: SH328318
- Community: Llanbedrog
- Principal area: Gwynedd
- Preserved county: Gwynedd
- Country: Wales
- Sovereign state: United Kingdom
- Post town: PWLLHELI
- Postcode district: LL53
- Dialling code: 01758
- Police: North Wales
- Fire: North Wales
- Ambulance: Welsh
- UK Parliament: Dwyfor Meirionnydd
- Senedd Cymru – Welsh Parliament: Dwyfor Meirionnydd
- List of places UK Wales Gwynedd 52.857°N 4.484°W Map of the community

Llanbedrog is a village and community on the Llŷn peninsula of Gwynedd in Wales. It is situated on the south side of the peninsula on the A499 between Pwllheli and Abersoch. Formerly in the county of Caernarfonshire, it had a population of 1,020 in 2001, reducing slightly to 1,002 at the 2011 Census.

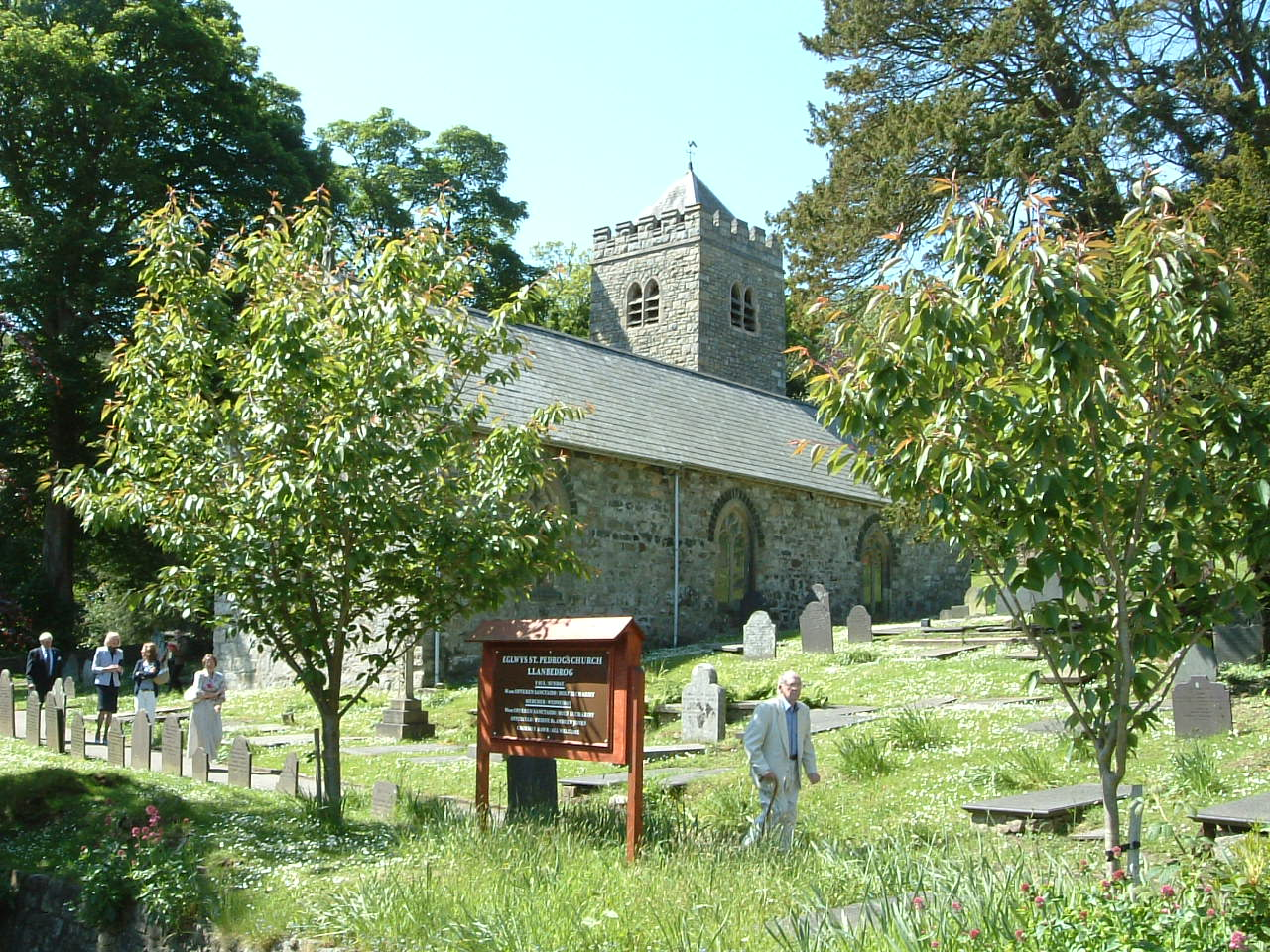
St Pedrog's Church

The village takes its name from Saint Petroc, a 6th-century Celtic saint. Petroc may be a form of the name Patrick, but Saint Petroc should not be confused with Saint Patrick. Saint Petrog's church is a grade II* listed building.

South of the village is the headland and open area of Mynydd Tir-y-cwmwd. Granite quarrying was commercially important in the late 19th century and the first half of the 20th century. The quarry closed down in 1949.

54.0% of residents aged three and over reported being able to speak Welsh in the 2011 Census, as compared to 52.6% reporting being able to do so in the 2001 Census.

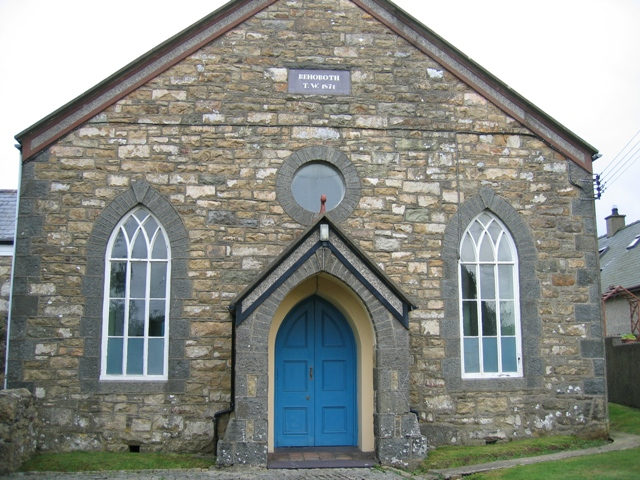
Rehoboth, one of Llanbedrog's several chapels

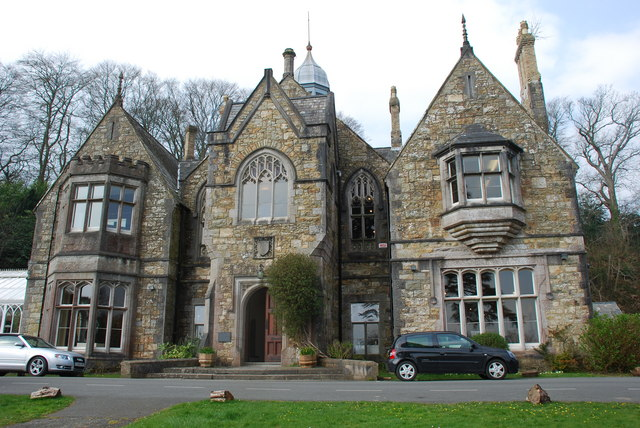
Plas Glyn-y-Weddw

Holiday-makers started coming to Llanbedrog in significant numbers in the early 20th century, and the Pwllheli and Llanbedrog Tramway was built, linking the village to Pwllheli. Most of the track has now eroded and washed away but sections are still visible. The beach is now managed by the National Trust. In 1856 a dower house, "Plas Glyn-y-Weddw", was built in lower Llanbedrog for Lady Love Jones Parry. The house is now an important centre for the arts.

The community is home to RAF Penrhos, a refuge for Poles since 1949.
