= Murlough Nature Reserve =

Northern Irish nature reserve

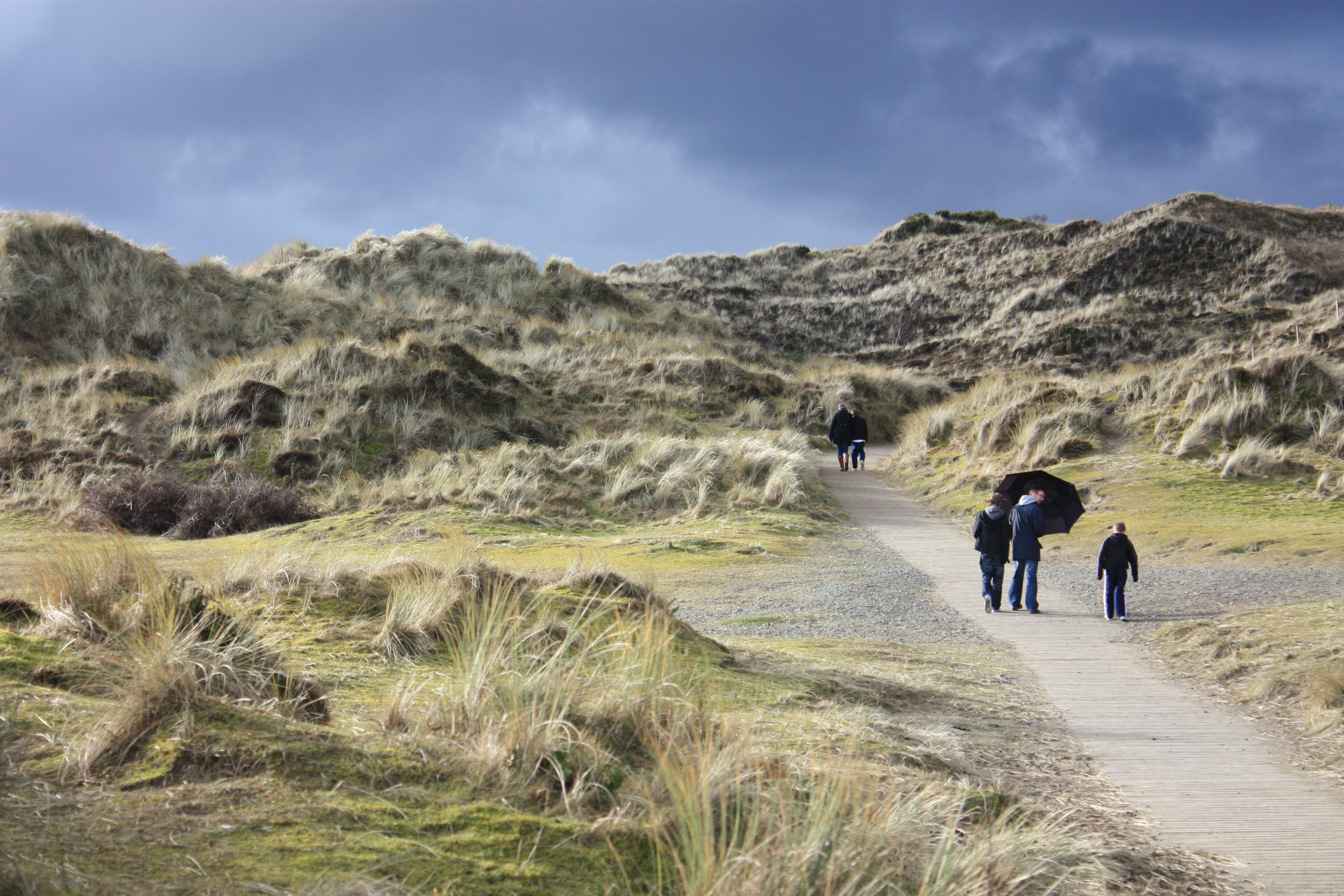
- Murlough Nature Reserve, February 2010

- Location within Northern Ireland
- Location: County Down, Northern Ireland
- Nearest city: Belfast
- Coordinates: 54°14′03″N 5°51′10″W
- Area: 697 acres (2.82 km^{2})
- Established: 1967
- Governing body: National Trust

Murlough Nature Reserve is a dune heathland on the coast of County Down in Northern Ireland, near Newcastle. It is on a peninsula between Dundrum Bay and Murlough Bay (Irish: Murlach, meaning 'sea inlet') and has views of Slieve Donard, the highest peak in the Mourne Mountains. Its 6,000-year-old sand dune system has been managed by the National Trust since 1967, when it became Ireland's first nature reserve. It is also home to Murlough Beach.

== Features ==
At 697 acres, it is the largest dune heathland in Ireland, with a network of paths and boardwalks through the dunes. Breeding birds include meadow pipit, Eurasian skylark, common cuckoo, European stonechat, common linnet and common reed bunting. Shorehauling grey seal and common seals are also common in the area. Between 50 and 130 common and grey seals regularly use the area for moulting, resting and feeding. Rare plants local to the site are pyramidal orchid and carline thistle.

On the Dundrum Bay side of the nature reserve is Murlough Beach, a shingle beach and four-mile-long Blue Flag beach.

Grid ref: J414351.

== History ==
In 1857, Arthur Hill, 4th Marquess of Downshire built Murlough House as a summer residence on the peninsula. A wooden bridge was built connecting to Keel Point, replaced in 1893 with the current granite one.

The house and sand dunes were extensively used by the US Army during the Second World War. In 1942 the US 1st Battalion, 13th Armored (1st Division) arrived followed by the 818th Tank Destroyer Battalion (XV Corps) in April 1944.

== Moths and butterflies ==
Several rare moths and butterflies can be found within the reserve. 23 butterfly species have been recorded at Murlough NNR, the marsh fritillary (Euphydryas aurinia), is of European importance - other notable species include dark-green fritillary (Argynnis aglaja), grayling (Hipparchia semele) and cryptic wood white (Leptidea juvernica). One species, the wall brown butterfly (Lasiommata megera) has not been recorded for several years. 787 species of moth have been recorded at Murlough Nature Reserve - examples include small elephant hawkmoth (Deilephila porcellus), sand dart (Agrotis ripae) and the micro moths Pyrausta cingulata and Hysterophora maculosana. A total of 810 Lepidoptera (butterflies and moths) have been recorded within the nature reserve boundary.

Notable migrant species noted in the area have included: cosmopolitan (Leucania loreyi), white-speck, the delicate. In 2012 a Stephens' gem (Megalographa biloba) was recorded at Murlough NNR - this was the 1st record for Ireland of this North American species.

== Gallery ==
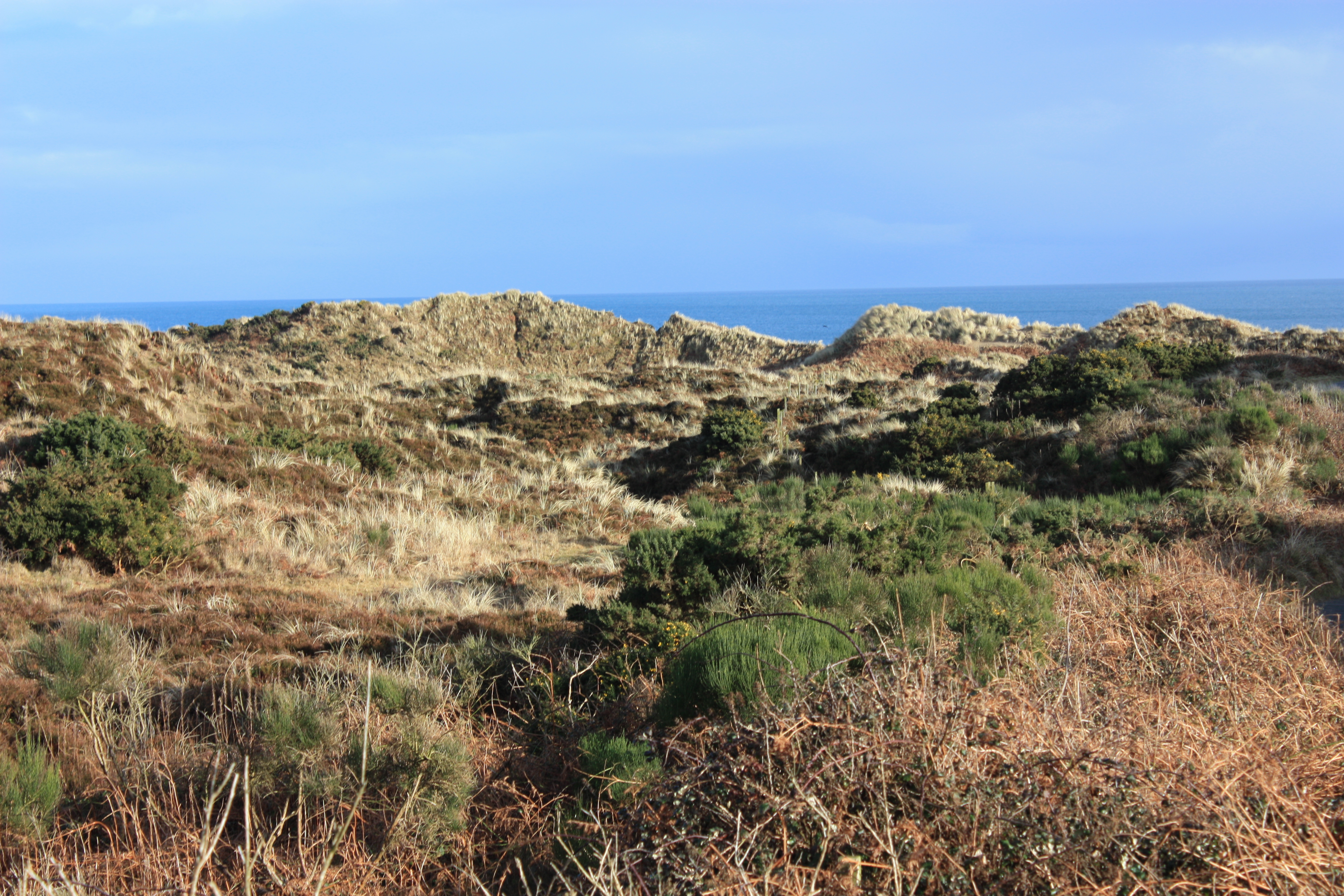
Landscape, February 2010

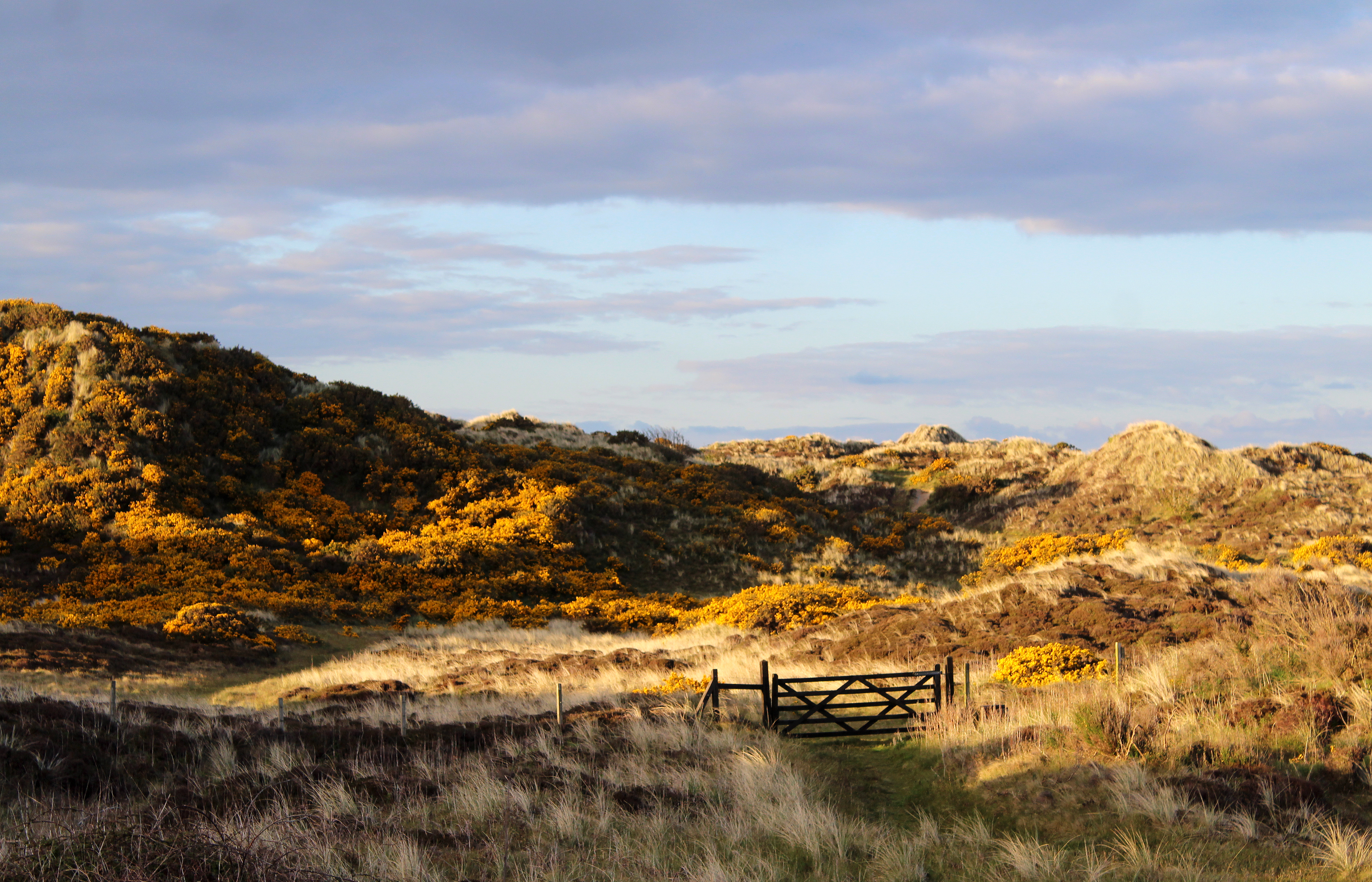
Gorse-covered dunes, May 2021

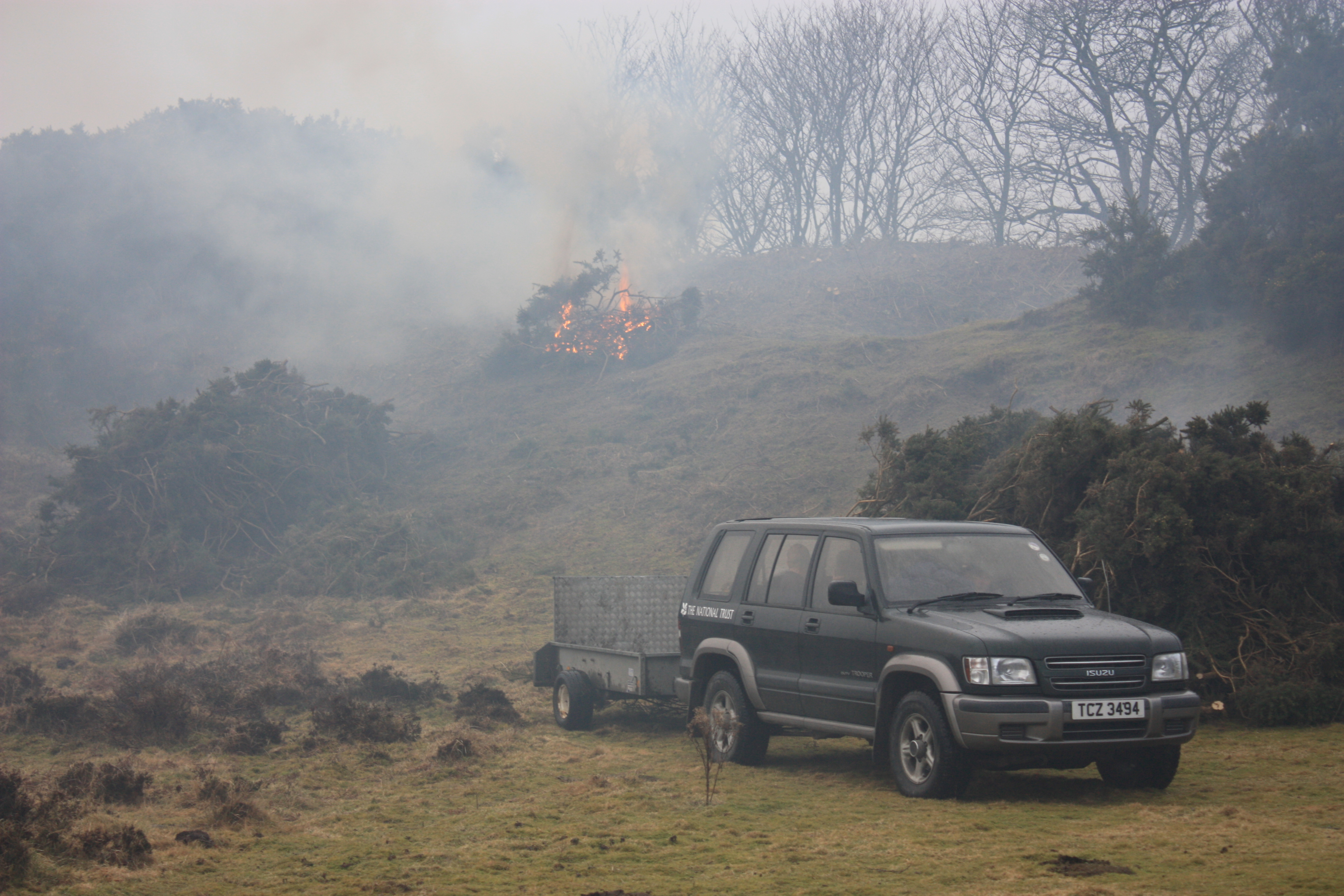
Gorse burning, February 2010

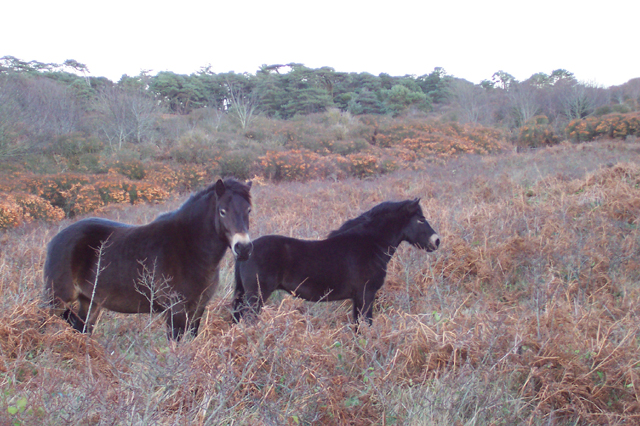
Exmoor ponies at Murlough, used for grazing management
