= National Trust for Scotland =

Scottish conservation charity

- Abbreviation: NTS
- Formation: 1 May 1931
- Legal status: Trust
- Headquarters: Edinburgh
- Location: Scotland
- Members: 340,800
- Key people: Jackie Bird (President); Dame Sue Bruce (Chair); Philip Long (Chief Executive)
- Staff: 672 full-time equivalent; 1,448 total
- Volunteers: 4,000
- Website: www.nts.org.uk

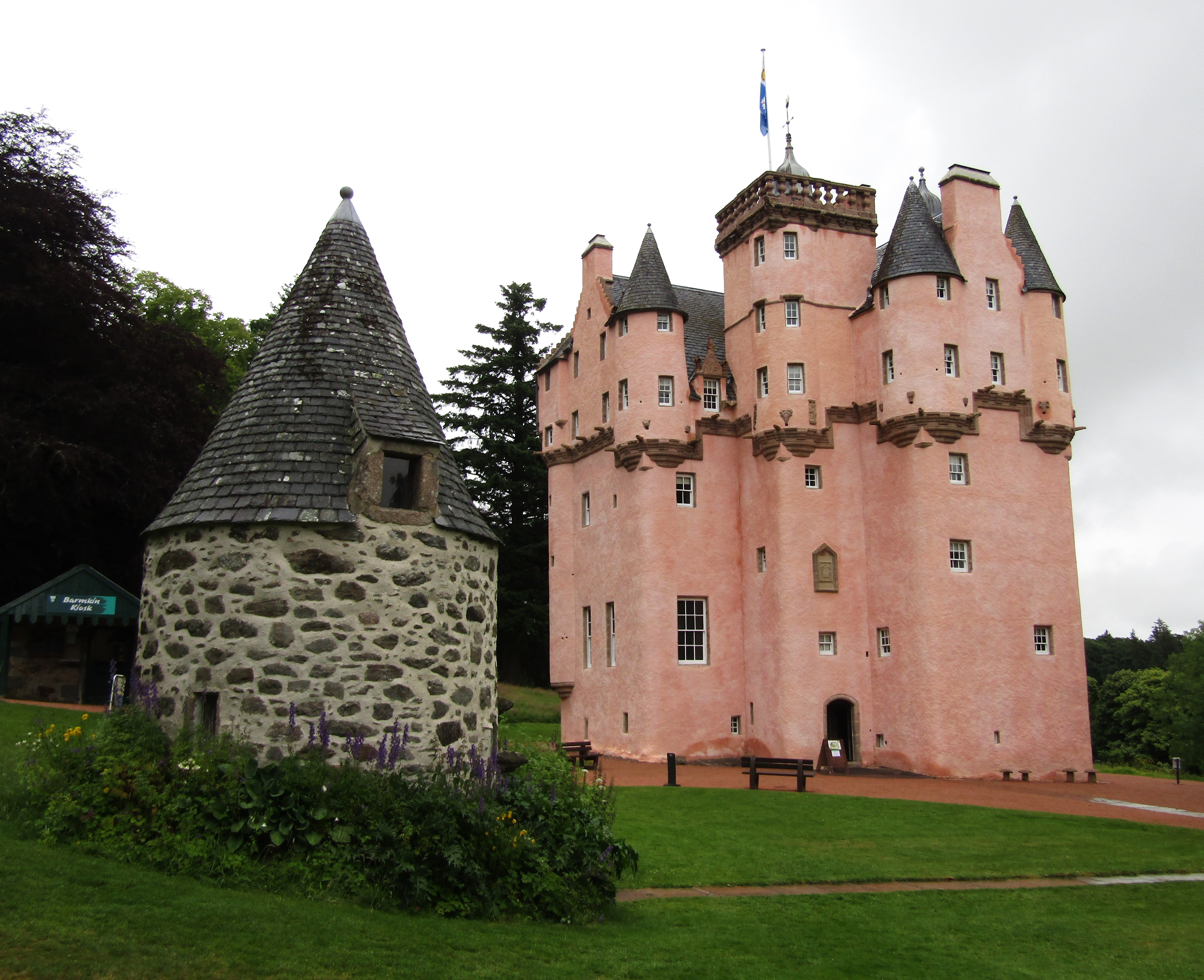
Craigievar Castle, Aberdeenshire, one of many properties in the care of the charity.

The National Trust for Scotland (Scottish Gaelic: Urras Nàiseanta na h-Alba) is a Scottish conservation organisation. It is the largest membership organisation in Scotland and describes itself as "the charity that cares for, shares and speaks up for Scotland's magnificent heritage".

The trust owns and manages around 130 properties and 76,000 hectares (190,000 acres; 760 km^{2}) of land, including castles, ancient small dwellings, historic sites, gardens, coastline, mountains and countryside. It is similar in function to the National Trust, which covers England, Wales, and Northern Ireland, and to other national trusts worldwide.

== History ==
The trust was established in 1931 as the "National Trust for Scotland for Places of Historic Interest or Natural Beauty", following discussions held in the smoking room of Pollok House. The Trust was incorporated on 1 May 1931, with John Stewart-Murray, 8th Duke of Atholl being elected as its first president, Sir Iain Colqhoun serving as the first chairman. Sir John Stirling Maxwell, owner of Pollok House, was appointed as a vice-president, and provided the trust with its first property, Crookston Castle. Another early acquisition was Glen Coe, which was purchased with assistance from the Scottish Mountaineering Club in 1935.

National Trust for Scotland Order Confirmation Act 1935 (Note: Section 2.)
- Act of Parliament
- Parliament of the United Kingdom
- Long title: An Act to confirm a Provisional Order under the Private Legislation Procedure (Scotland) Act 1936 relating to the National Trust for Scotland.
- Citation: 26 Geo. 5 & 1 Edw. 8. c. ii
- Territorial extent: United Kingdom

Dates
- Royal assent: 10 December 1935
- Commencement: 10 December 1935 (Note: The Acts of Parliament (Commencement) Act 1793.)
Other legislation
Amended by	Abolition of Feudal Tenure etc. (Scotland) Act 2000

Status: Amended

Text of statute as originally enacted

Following the passage of the National Trust for Scotland Order Confirmation Act 1935 (26 Geo. 5 & 1 Edw. 8. c. ii), the trust gained the power to declare its properties "inalienable", meaning that they are effectively held in perpetuity, and can only be removed from the trust with parliamentary permission.

When the trust took on the management of mountain estates there was controversy concerning issues such as the siting of visitor centres, which some considered inappropriate for land of "wild" character. The trust has since removed some intrusive facilities, with the original Glen Coe Visitor Centre being removed in 2002; a new centre was built lower down the glen. Similarly the visitor centre at Ben Lawers was removed in 2012.

In August 2010, a report called Fit For Purpose by George Reid, commissioned by the Trust, cited shortcomings that were corrected through organizational restructuring largely completed by the end of its 2011/12 Fiscal Year. The stabilisation of the Trust's finances allowed it to make its first acquisition in seven years when it bought the Alloa Tower in Clackmannanshire in 2015.

Historians working for the NTS have estimated that at least 36 of the 139 historic properties owned by the Trust have links to the Atlantic slave trade. Many former of owners of NTS properties either directly or indirectly benefited from the ownership or exploitation of enslaved people, or received compensation payments from the Slave Compensation Act 1837.

== Organisation ==
The trust is a registered charity under Scottish law. As of 2024 it employed 1,144 people in total (taking account of seasonal employees), up from 760 in 2022. This equated to 617 people on a full-time equivalent basis, up from 469 in 2022. The trust's patron is King Charles III; the president is Jackie Bird; the CEO is Philip Long; and the chair is Dame Sue Bruce.

== Funding ==
For the year ending 28 February 2022, the trust's total income was £49.3 million, up from £44.3 million in 2020–21. The largest sources of income were membership subscriptions (£14.7 million), commercial activities (£9.0 million), investment income (£5.3 million), and property income (£5.3 million). In the same year the trust's total expenditure was £51.9 million, up from £44.1 million in 2020–21. The trust therefore recorded an operating deficit of £2.7 million, however this was less bad than anticipated and largely attributed to the aftermath of the COVID-19 pandemic. A three-year business recovery plan was put in place to restore financial sustainability and ensure the trust was able to undertake repairs and maintenance delayed by the pandemic, and to continue to invest in conservation and visitor engagement activities at its properties.

For the year ended 29 February 2024, the trust's total income was £69.5 million; in the same year the trust's total expenditure was £75.9 million. The trust therefore recorded an annual operating deficit of £6.4 million, however this loss was offset with investment growth of £7.9 million during the year, meaning the trust recorded a small increase in overall balance carried forward to the following year.

== Membership ==
Annual membership of the trust allows free entry to properties and "Discovery Tickets" are available for shorter term visitors. Membership also provides free entry to National Trust properties in England and Wales and Northern Ireland, and many other national trusts worldwide; members of these organisations enjoy a reciprocal right of free entry to NTS properties. The trust has independent sister organisations in the United States (The National Trust for Scotland Foundation USA), and Canada (The Canadian National Trust for Scotland Foundation). The organisation's membership magazine was Heritage Scotland until 2002 when it was re-named Scotland in Trust.

For the maintenance of its nature properties, the trust depends on the contributions of volunteers, with local circles of conservation volunteers working on projects during weekends. The charity also formerly organised working holidays called "Thistle Camps" on various properties, with activities undertaken including footpath maintenance and woodland work such as rhododendron control. However as of 2025 Thistle Camps are currently not on offer, with the programme having originally been suspended in 2020 due to the COVID-19 pandemic.

== Properties ==
=== Historic houses ===
The trust owns 27 historic houses, ranging from large houses such as Culzean Castle and the House of Dun to humbler dwellings such as the Tenement House and Moirlanich Longhouse.

=== Gardens ===
The trust is Scotland's largest garden owner with just under 70 gardens that cover 238 hectares (590 acres) and contain 13,500 varieties of plant. These gardens include 35 "major gardens" with the remainder forming part of other properties. The gardens represent the full history of Scottish gardening ranging from the medieval, to the renaissance at Culross Palace, through the 18th-century picturesque at Culzean Castle and Victorian formality at the House of Dun to 20th-century plant collections at Brodick and Inverewe.

=== Coastline and countryside ===
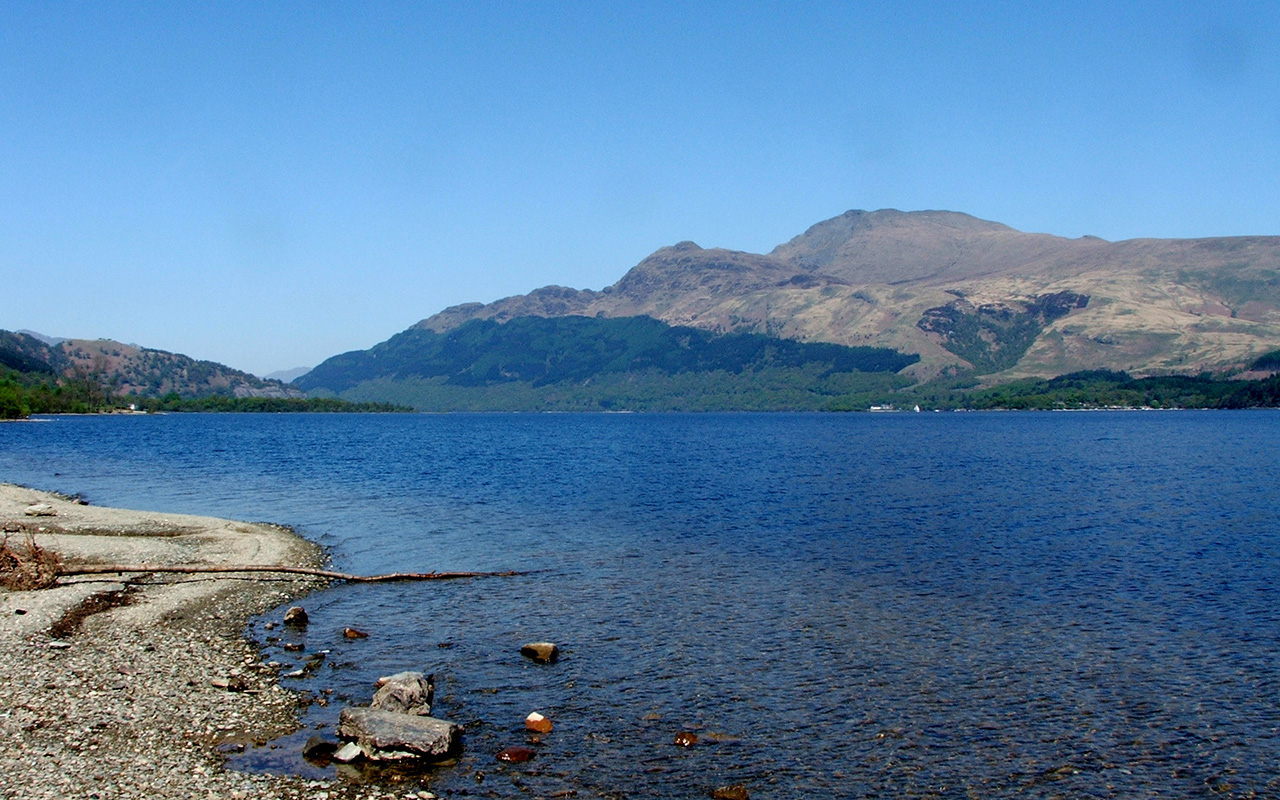
The Trust owns large areas of upland, including Ben Lomond.

The trust is the third largest land manager in Scotland, owning 76,000 hectares (190,000 acres; 290 square miles) of Scottish countryside including 46 Munros, eight national nature reserves, more than 400 islands and islets, and significant stretches of coastline. Trust countryside properties include Glen Coe, Torridon and Mar Lodge Estate.

The trust's management of its coastal and countryside sites is guided by its Wild Land Policy which aims to preserve the land in its undeveloped state and provide access and enjoyment to the public. Trust sites are home to a diverse variety of native wildlife. The Trust estimate that almost 25% of Scotland's seabirds nest on its island and coastal sites, equivalent to 8% of seabirds in Europe. The Trust's countryside properties are home to native mammal species including red deer, pine marten, wildcat and red squirrel.

Since 1957, the trust have owned and managed the archipelago of St Kilda, Scotland's first World Heritage Site and the only World Heritage Site in the UK to be listed for both its natural and cultural significance. St Kilda and the surrounding sea stacks are home to over one million seabirds as well as three species unique to the islands; the Soay sheep; St Kilda field mouse and St Kilda wren.

=== Paintings and sculpture collection ===
Across its properties the trust is responsible for the conservation and display of hundreds of thousands of objects from paintings to furniture and domestic tools. The primary aim of the trust's curatorship is to present collections and works of art in the historic settings for which they were commissioned or acquired.

=== Most visited sites ===
During the 2023-2024 financial year the trust received in 4.5 million visitors in total, including an estimated 1.8 million visitors recorded at free-to-enter countryside properties: the trust considers this figure to be below the actual number due to practical challenges of recording open access across a large countryside estate. In the year 2021–21 the trust welcomed a total of 2.2 million visitors to its properties, of which 1.3 million were visits to "gated" properties (properties which non-members are required to pay for entry). In 2025 the 10 most visited properties were:

#	Property	Location	Visitors
1	Glenfinnan Monument	Highland	659,935
2	Glen Coe	Highland	399,968
3	Newhailes House & Gardens	East Lothian	395,613
4	Culloden	Highland	366,269
5	Culzean Castle and Country Park	South Ayrshire	334,000
6	Gladstone's Land	Edinburgh	316,559
7	The Hermitage	Perth and Kinross	264,605
8	Crathes Castle and Gardens	Aberdeenshire	231,746
9	Robert Burns Birthplace Museum	South Ayrshire	210,798
10	Killiecrankie	Perth and Kinross	175,689

=== Gallery ===
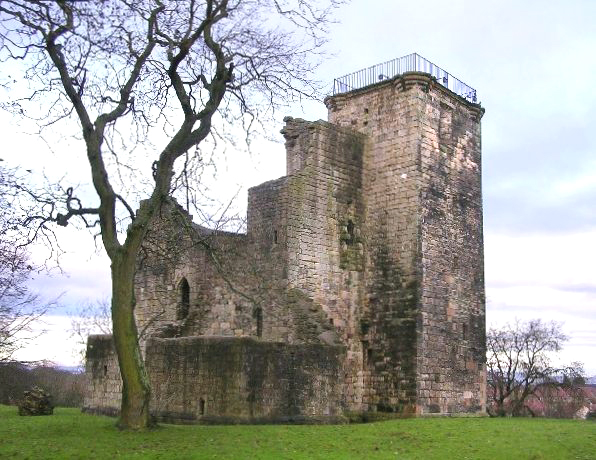
Crookston Castle in Glasgow was the first property acquired by the Trust.

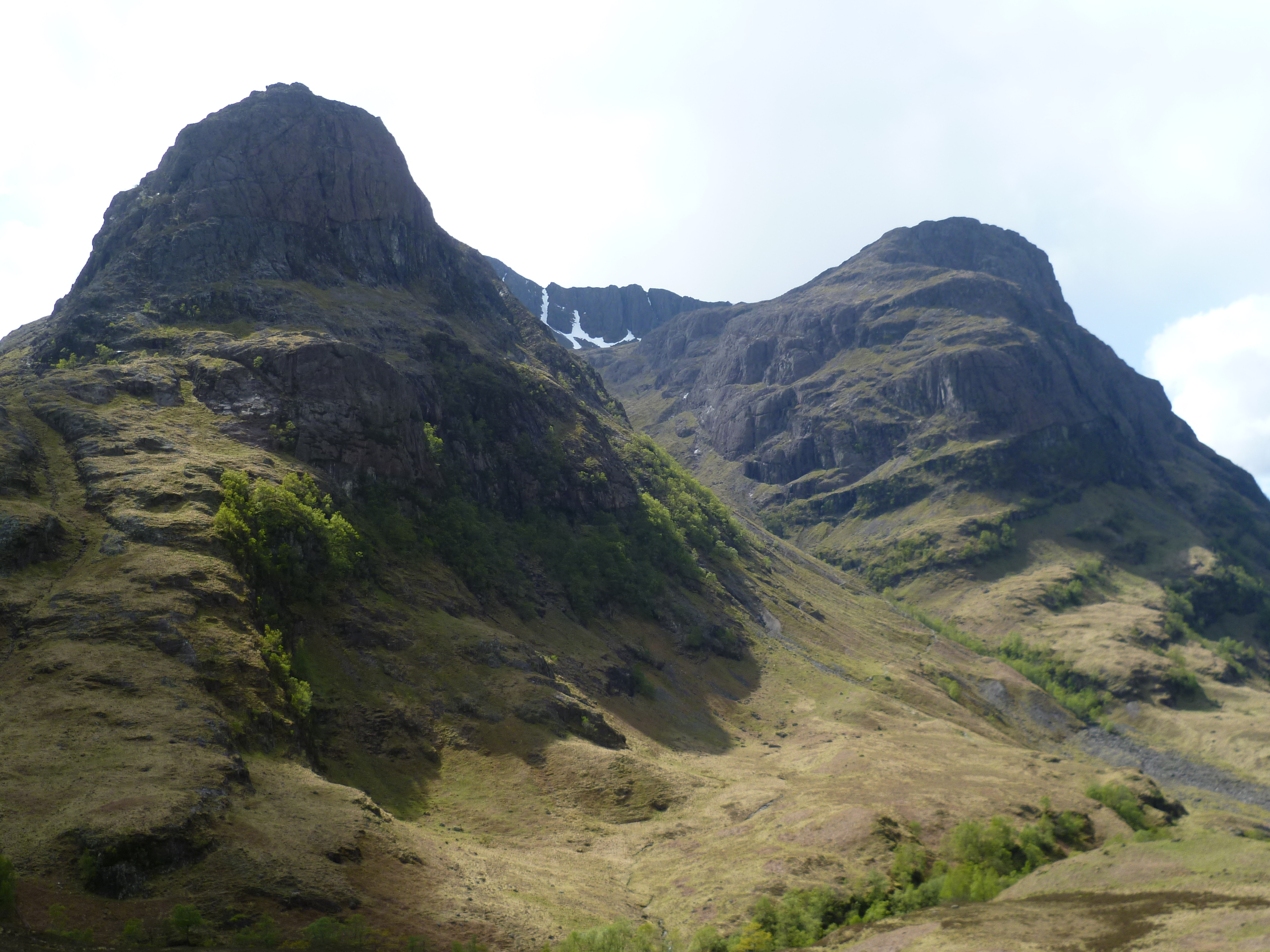
Glen Coe, the Trust's first major land acquisition

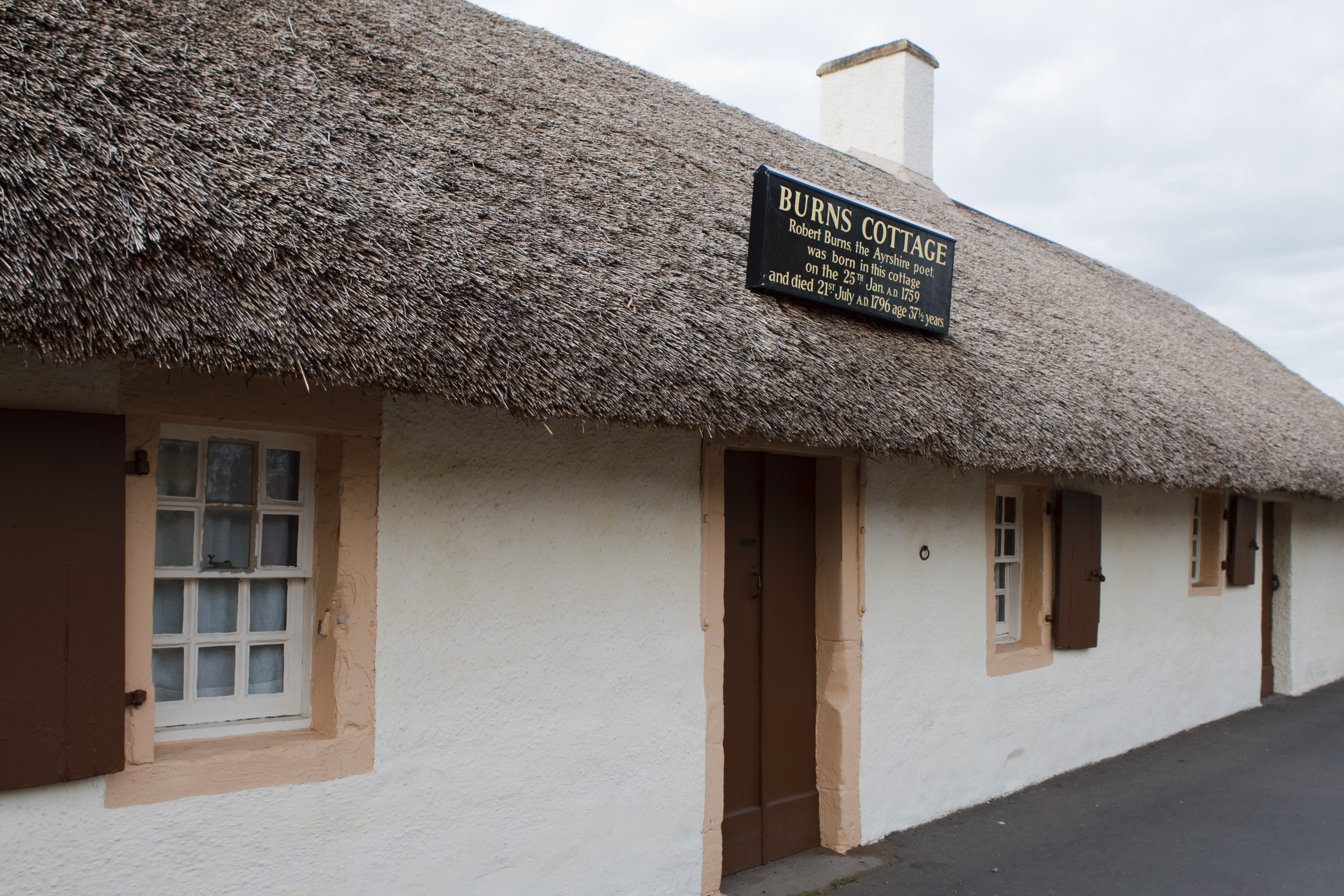
Robert Burns Birthplace Museum, one of the Trust's most popular visitor sites

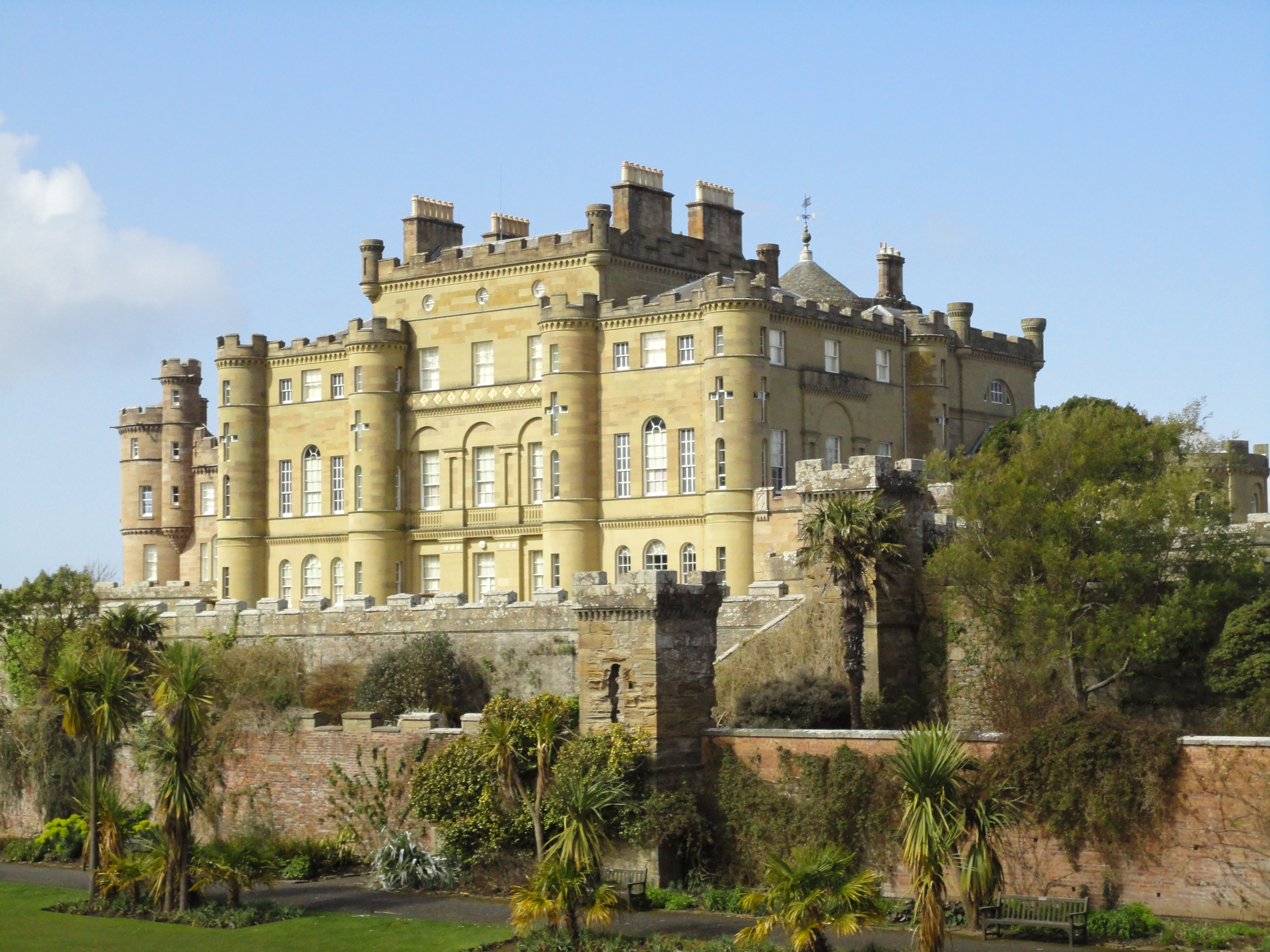
Culzean Castle in South Ayrshire is one of the Trust's most iconic sites.

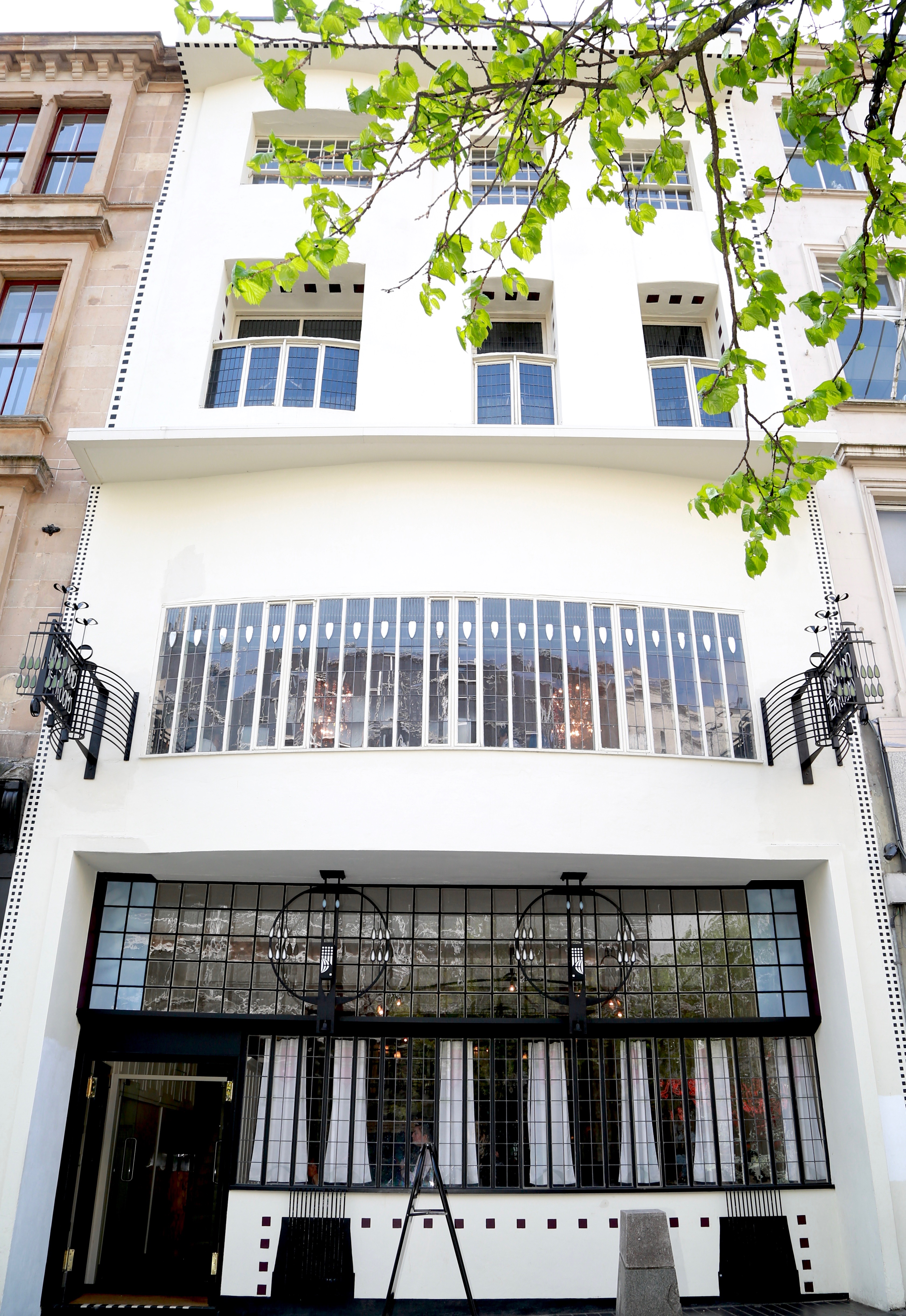
The Willow Tearooms were the Trust’s most recent acquisition in 2024.

== See also ==
- List of National Trust for Scotland properties
- Historic Environment Scotland

== Bibliography ==
- Bremner, Douglas. For the Benefit of the Nation. McGraw-Hill Contemporary. 2001. ISBN 978-0-901625-69-4
- Greenoak, Francesca. The Gardens of the National Trust for Scotland. Aurum Press Ltd. 2005. ISBN 1845130375
